

8001–8100 

|-bgcolor=#d6d6d6
| 8001 Ramsden ||  ||  || October 4, 1986 || Kleť || A. Mrkos || THM || align=right | 13 km || 
|-id=002 bgcolor=#fefefe
| 8002 Tonyevans ||  ||  || December 4, 1986 || Kleť || A. Mrkos || NYS || align=right | 2.7 km || 
|-id=003 bgcolor=#fefefe
| 8003 Kelvin || 1987 RJ ||  || September 1, 1987 || La Silla || E. W. Elst || — || align=right | 4.9 km || 
|-id=004 bgcolor=#d6d6d6
| 8004 || 1987 RX || — || September 12, 1987 || La Silla || H. Debehogne || — || align=right | 8.6 km || 
|-id=005 bgcolor=#E9E9E9
| 8005 Albinadubois || 1988 MJ ||  || June 16, 1988 || Palomar || E. F. Helin || — || align=right | 6.5 km || 
|-id=006 bgcolor=#E9E9E9
| 8006 Tacchini || 1988 QU ||  || August 22, 1988 || Bologna || San Vittore Obs. || — || align=right | 6.5 km || 
|-id=007 bgcolor=#E9E9E9
| 8007 ||  || — || September 8, 1988 || La Silla || H. Debehogne || MIS || align=right | 9.0 km || 
|-id=008 bgcolor=#E9E9E9
| 8008 ||  || — || October 10, 1988 || Gekko || Y. Oshima || AST || align=right | 13 km || 
|-id=009 bgcolor=#E9E9E9
| 8009 Béguin ||  ||  || January 25, 1989 || Caussols || C. Pollas || PAL || align=right | 5.9 km || 
|-id=010 bgcolor=#d6d6d6
| 8010 Böhnhardt ||  ||  || April 3, 1989 || La Silla || E. W. Elst || HYG || align=right | 16 km || 
|-id=011 bgcolor=#E9E9E9
| 8011 Saijokeiichi ||  ||  || November 29, 1989 || Kitami || K. Endate, K. Watanabe || MIS || align=right | 7.0 km || 
|-id=012 bgcolor=#d6d6d6
| 8012 ||  || — || April 29, 1990 || Siding Spring || A. Żytkow, M. J. Irwin || THM || align=right | 8.7 km || 
|-id=013 bgcolor=#FFC2E0
| 8013 Gordonmoore || 1990 KA ||  || May 18, 1990 || Palomar || E. F. Helin || AMO +1km || align=right | 2.3 km || 
|-id=014 bgcolor=#FFC2E0
| 8014 || 1990 MF || — || June 26, 1990 || Palomar || E. F. Helin || APOPHA || align=right data-sort-value="0.7" | 700 m || 
|-id=015 bgcolor=#fefefe
| 8015 ||  || — || August 24, 1990 || Palomar || H. E. Holt || — || align=right | 3.1 km || 
|-id=016 bgcolor=#fefefe
| 8016 ||  || — || August 27, 1990 || Palomar || H. E. Holt || FLO || align=right | 3.6 km || 
|-id=017 bgcolor=#fefefe
| 8017 ||  || — || September 15, 1990 || Palomar || H. E. Holt || EUT || align=right | 3.3 km || 
|-id=018 bgcolor=#fefefe
| 8018 || 1990 SW || — || September 16, 1990 || Palomar || H. E. Holt || — || align=right | 4.3 km || 
|-id=019 bgcolor=#fefefe
| 8019 Karachkina ||  ||  || October 14, 1990 || Tautenburg Observatory || L. D. Schmadel, F. Börngen || — || align=right | 3.0 km || 
|-id=020 bgcolor=#fefefe
| 8020 Erzgebirge ||  ||  || October 14, 1990 || Tautenburg Observatory || F. Börngen, L. D. Schmadel || — || align=right | 5.2 km || 
|-id=021 bgcolor=#fefefe
| 8021 Walter ||  ||  || October 22, 1990 || Palomar || C. S. Shoemaker, D. H. Levy || PHO || align=right | 6.3 km || 
|-id=022 bgcolor=#fefefe
| 8022 Scottcrossfield ||  ||  || November 10, 1990 || Kleť || A. Mrkos || — || align=right | 8.3 km || 
|-id=023 bgcolor=#fefefe
| 8023 Josephwalker || 1991 DD ||  || February 17, 1991 || Oohira || T. Urata || NYS || align=right | 3.5 km || 
|-id=024 bgcolor=#fefefe
| 8024 Robertwhite || 1991 FN ||  || March 17, 1991 || Palomar || E. F. Helin || H || align=right | 1.7 km || 
|-id=025 bgcolor=#E9E9E9
| 8025 Forrestpeterson ||  ||  || March 22, 1991 || La Silla || H. Debehogne || MRX || align=right | 6.7 km || 
|-id=026 bgcolor=#fefefe
| 8026 Johnmckay ||  ||  || May 8, 1991 || Palomar || E. F. Helin || Hmoonslow || align=right | 1.7 km || 
|-id=027 bgcolor=#d6d6d6
| 8027 Robertrushworth ||  ||  || August 7, 1991 || Palomar || H. E. Holt || — || align=right | 20 km || 
|-id=028 bgcolor=#d6d6d6
| 8028 Joeengle || 1991 QE ||  || August 30, 1991 || Siding Spring || R. H. McNaught || — || align=right | 19 km || 
|-id=029 bgcolor=#d6d6d6
| 8029 Miltthompson ||  ||  || September 15, 1991 || Palomar || H. E. Holt || HYG || align=right | 16 km || 
|-id=030 bgcolor=#d6d6d6
| 8030 Williamknight || 1991 SK ||  || September 29, 1991 || Siding Spring || R. H. McNaught || — || align=right | 21 km || 
|-id=031 bgcolor=#fefefe
| 8031 Williamdana || 1992 ER ||  || March 7, 1992 || Kushiro || S. Ueda, H. Kaneda || — || align=right | 4.8 km || 
|-id=032 bgcolor=#fefefe
| 8032 Michaeladams ||  ||  || March 8, 1992 || Kushiro || S. Ueda, H. Kaneda || KLI || align=right | 9.1 km || 
|-id=033 bgcolor=#fefefe
| 8033 ||  || — || March 26, 1992 || Kushiro || S. Ueda, H. Kaneda || — || align=right | 6.1 km || 
|-id=034 bgcolor=#FFC2E0
| 8034 Akka || 1992 LR ||  || June 3, 1992 || Palomar || C. S. Shoemaker, E. M. Shoemaker || AMO +1km || align=right data-sort-value="0.97" | 970 m || 
|-id=035 bgcolor=#FFC2E0
| 8035 || 1992 TB || — || October 2, 1992 || Kitt Peak || Spacewatch || APO +1km || align=right | 1.4 km || 
|-id=036 bgcolor=#d6d6d6
| 8036 Maehara ||  ||  || October 26, 1992 || Kitami || K. Endate, K. Watanabe || — || align=right | 15 km || 
|-id=037 bgcolor=#FFC2E0
| 8037 ||  || — || April 20, 1993 || Siding Spring || R. H. McNaught || AMO +1km || align=right | 1.7 km || 
|-id=038 bgcolor=#fefefe
| 8038 || 1993 JG || — || May 11, 1993 || Nachi-Katsuura || Y. Shimizu, T. Urata || — || align=right | 4.4 km || 
|-id=039 bgcolor=#fefefe
| 8039 Grandprism ||  ||  || September 15, 1993 || La Silla || H. Debehogne, E. W. Elst || NYS || align=right | 2.5 km || 
|-id=040 bgcolor=#E9E9E9
| 8040 Utsumikazuhiko ||  ||  || September 16, 1993 || Kitami || K. Endate, K. Watanabe || — || align=right | 4.8 km || 
|-id=041 bgcolor=#E9E9E9
| 8041 Masumoto ||  ||  || November 15, 1993 || Kashihara || F. Uto || EUN || align=right | 9.0 km || 
|-id=042 bgcolor=#d6d6d6
| 8042 ||  || — || January 12, 1994 || Kushiro || S. Ueda, H. Kaneda || — || align=right | 8.2 km || 
|-id=043 bgcolor=#fefefe
| 8043 Fukuhara ||  ||  || December 6, 1994 || Oizumi || T. Kobayashi || — || align=right | 4.6 km || 
|-id=044 bgcolor=#fefefe
| 8044 Tsuchiyama || 1994 YT ||  || December 28, 1994 || Oizumi || T. Kobayashi || — || align=right | 11 km || 
|-id=045 bgcolor=#E9E9E9
| 8045 Kamiyama || 1995 AW ||  || January 6, 1995 || Oizumi || T. Kobayashi || — || align=right | 11 km || 
|-id=046 bgcolor=#fefefe
| 8046 Ajiki || 1995 BU ||  || January 25, 1995 || Oizumi || T. Kobayashi || — || align=right | 5.4 km || 
|-id=047 bgcolor=#fefefe
| 8047 Akikinoshita ||  ||  || January 31, 1995 || Oizumi || T. Kobayashi || — || align=right | 5.6 km || 
|-id=048 bgcolor=#d6d6d6
| 8048 Andrle ||  ||  || February 22, 1995 || Kleť || M. Tichý, Z. Moravec || EOS || align=right | 11 km || 
|-id=049 bgcolor=#d6d6d6
| 8049 ||  || — || March 17, 1996 || Haleakalā || NEAT || KOR || align=right | 6.6 km || 
|-id=050 bgcolor=#fefefe
| 8050 Beishida || 1996 ST ||  || September 18, 1996 || Xinglong || SCAP || — || align=right | 2.4 km || 
|-id=051 bgcolor=#fefefe
| 8051 Pistoria ||  ||  || August 13, 1997 || San Marcello || L. Tesi, G. Cattani || — || align=right | 3.1 km || 
|-id=052 bgcolor=#d6d6d6
| 8052 Novalis || 2093 P-L ||  || September 24, 1960 || Palomar || PLS || EOS || align=right | 9.5 km || 
|-id=053 bgcolor=#fefefe
| 8053 Kleist || 4082 P-L ||  || September 25, 1960 || Palomar || PLS || NYS || align=right | 5.0 km || 
|-id=054 bgcolor=#fefefe
| 8054 Brentano || 4581 P-L ||  || September 24, 1960 || Palomar || PLS || slow || align=right | 4.2 km || 
|-id=055 bgcolor=#d6d6d6
| 8055 Arnim || 5004 P-L ||  || October 17, 1960 || Palomar || PLS || — || align=right | 8.4 km || 
|-id=056 bgcolor=#E9E9E9
| 8056 Tieck || 6038 P-L ||  || September 24, 1960 || Palomar || PLS || — || align=right | 4.7 km || 
|-id=057 bgcolor=#d6d6d6
| 8057 Hofmannsthal || 4034 T-1 ||  || March 26, 1971 || Palomar || PLS || — || align=right | 8.2 km || 
|-id=058 bgcolor=#fefefe
| 8058 Zuckmayer || 3241 T-3 ||  || October 16, 1977 || Palomar || PLS || — || align=right | 5.0 km || 
|-id=059 bgcolor=#E9E9E9
| 8059 Deliyannis || 1957 JP ||  || May 6, 1957 || Brooklyn || Indiana University || EUN || align=right | 12 km || 
|-id=060 bgcolor=#C2FFFF
| 8060 Anius ||  ||  || September 19, 1973 || Palomar || PLS || L4ERY || align=right | 38 km || 
|-id=061 bgcolor=#d6d6d6
| 8061 Gaudium || 1975 UF ||  || October 27, 1975 || Zimmerwald || P. Wild || THM || align=right | 9.5 km || 
|-id=062 bgcolor=#fefefe
| 8062 Okhotsymskij || 1977 EZ ||  || March 13, 1977 || Nauchnij || N. S. Chernykh || — || align=right | 14 km || 
|-id=063 bgcolor=#d6d6d6
| 8063 Cristinathomas ||  ||  || December 7, 1977 || Palomar || S. J. Bus || KOR || align=right | 5.3 km || 
|-id=064 bgcolor=#E9E9E9
| 8064 Lisitsa || 1978 RR ||  || September 1, 1978 || Nauchnij || N. S. Chernykh || DOR || align=right | 15 km || 
|-id=065 bgcolor=#fefefe
| 8065 Nakhodkin ||  ||  || March 31, 1979 || Nauchnij || N. S. Chernykh || — || align=right | 3.4 km || 
|-id=066 bgcolor=#d6d6d6
| 8066 Poldimeri ||  ||  || August 6, 1980 || La Silla || R. M. West || — || align=right | 20 km || 
|-id=067 bgcolor=#E9E9E9
| 8067 Helfenstein || 1980 RU ||  || September 7, 1980 || Anderson Mesa || E. Bowell || — || align=right | 23 km || 
|-id=068 bgcolor=#E9E9E9
| 8068 Vishnureddy ||  ||  || March 6, 1981 || Siding Spring || S. J. Bus || — || align=right | 5.2 km || 
|-id=069 bgcolor=#fefefe
| 8069 Benweiss ||  ||  || March 2, 1981 || Siding Spring || S. J. Bus || V || align=right | 5.8 km || 
|-id=070 bgcolor=#E9E9E9
| 8070 DeMeo ||  ||  || March 2, 1981 || Siding Spring || S. J. Bus || — || align=right | 8.1 km || 
|-id=071 bgcolor=#fefefe
| 8071 Simonelli || 1981 GO ||  || April 5, 1981 || Anderson Mesa || E. Bowell || — || align=right | 8.1 km || 
|-id=072 bgcolor=#fefefe
| 8072 Yojikondo ||  ||  || April 1, 1981 || Harvard Observatory || Harvard Obs. || NYS || align=right | 3.6 km || 
|-id=073 bgcolor=#E9E9E9
| 8073 Johnharmon || 1982 BS ||  || January 24, 1982 || Anderson Mesa || E. Bowell || EUN || align=right | 6.5 km || 
|-id=074 bgcolor=#E9E9E9
| 8074 Slade ||  ||  || November 20, 1984 || Palomar || E. Bowell || GEF || align=right | 4.6 km || 
|-id=075 bgcolor=#d6d6d6
| 8075 Roero || 1985 PE ||  || August 14, 1985 || Anderson Mesa || E. Bowell || — || align=right | 13 km || 
|-id=076 bgcolor=#d6d6d6
| 8076 Foscarini ||  ||  || September 15, 1985 || La Silla || H. Debehogne || THM || align=right | 13 km || 
|-id=077 bgcolor=#E9E9E9
| 8077 Hoyle ||  ||  || January 12, 1986 || Anderson Mesa || E. Bowell || moon || align=right | 11 km || 
|-id=078 bgcolor=#fefefe
| 8078 Carolejordan ||  ||  || September 6, 1986 || Anderson Mesa || E. Bowell || — || align=right | 3.4 km || 
|-id=079 bgcolor=#fefefe
| 8079 Bernardlovell ||  ||  || December 4, 1986 || Anderson Mesa || E. Bowell || — || align=right | 4.5 km || 
|-id=080 bgcolor=#d6d6d6
| 8080 Intel ||  ||  || November 17, 1987 || Caussols || CERGA || — || align=right | 7.8 km || 
|-id=081 bgcolor=#fefefe
| 8081 Leopardi || 1988 DD ||  || February 17, 1988 || Bologna || San Vittore Obs. || — || align=right | 8.4 km || 
|-id=082 bgcolor=#E9E9E9
| 8082 Haynes || 1988 NR ||  || July 12, 1988 || Palomar || E. F. Helin || MAR || align=right | 8.2 km || 
|-id=083 bgcolor=#E9E9E9
| 8083 Mayeda || 1988 VB ||  || November 1, 1988 || Geisei || T. Seki || DOR || align=right | 12 km || 
|-id=084 bgcolor=#d6d6d6
| 8084 Dallas ||  ||  || February 6, 1989 || Ayashi Station || M. Koishikawa || — || align=right | 13 km || 
|-id=085 bgcolor=#d6d6d6
| 8085 ||  || — || February 7, 1989 || La Silla || H. Debehogne || EOS || align=right | 12 km || 
|-id=086 bgcolor=#d6d6d6
| 8086 Peterthomas ||  ||  || September 1, 1989 || Palomar || E. Bowell || 3:2 || align=right | 26 km || 
|-id=087 bgcolor=#E9E9E9
| 8087 Kazutaka ||  ||  || November 29, 1989 || Kitami || K. Endate, K. Watanabe || — || align=right | 11 km || 
|-id=088 bgcolor=#fefefe
| 8088 Australia ||  ||  || September 23, 1990 || Nauchnij || G. R. Kastelʹ, L. V. Zhuravleva || FLO || align=right | 4.1 km || 
|-id=089 bgcolor=#fefefe
| 8089 Yukar ||  ||  || October 13, 1990 || Tautenburg Observatory || L. D. Schmadel, F. Börngen || ERI || align=right | 5.7 km || 
|-id=090 bgcolor=#d6d6d6
| 8090 ||  || — || September 15, 1991 || Palomar || H. E. Holt || — || align=right | 14 km || 
|-id=091 bgcolor=#fefefe
| 8091 || 1992 BG || — || January 24, 1992 || Oohira || T. Urata || KLI || align=right | 9.4 km || 
|-id=092 bgcolor=#fefefe
| 8092 ||  || — || February 29, 1992 || La Silla || UESAC || — || align=right | 5.3 km || 
|-id=093 bgcolor=#d6d6d6
| 8093 ||  || — || October 25, 1992 || Uenohara || N. Kawasato || KOR || align=right | 6.5 km || 
|-id=094 bgcolor=#d6d6d6
| 8094 ||  || — || October 24, 1992 || Dynic || A. Sugie || KOR || align=right | 6.4 km || 
|-id=095 bgcolor=#d6d6d6
| 8095 ||  || — || November 18, 1992 || Kushiro || S. Ueda, H. Kaneda || THM || align=right | 15 km || 
|-id=096 bgcolor=#fefefe
| 8096 Emilezola ||  ||  || July 20, 1993 || La Silla || E. W. Elst || NYS || align=right | 4.9 km || 
|-id=097 bgcolor=#fefefe
| 8097 Yamanishi || 1993 RE ||  || September 12, 1993 || Kitami || K. Endate, K. Watanabe || NYS || align=right | 6.2 km || 
|-id=098 bgcolor=#fefefe
| 8098 Miyamotoatsushi ||  ||  || September 19, 1993 || Kitami || K. Endate, K. Watanabe || — || align=right | 6.9 km || 
|-id=099 bgcolor=#E9E9E9
| 8099 Okudoiyoshimi || 1993 TE ||  || October 8, 1993 || Yatsuka || H. Abe, S. Miyasaka || — || align=right | 4.0 km || 
|-id=100 bgcolor=#E9E9E9
| 8100 Nobeyama || 1993 XF ||  || December 4, 1993 || Nyukasa || M. Hirasawa, S. Suzuki || HEN || align=right | 6.7 km || 
|}

8101–8200 

|-bgcolor=#d6d6d6
| 8101 Yasue ||  ||  || December 15, 1993 || Oizumi || T. Kobayashi || KOR || align=right | 5.0 km || 
|-id=102 bgcolor=#d6d6d6
| 8102 Yoshikazu ||  ||  || January 14, 1994 || Oizumi || T. Kobayashi || KOR || align=right | 5.4 km || 
|-id=103 bgcolor=#d6d6d6
| 8103 Fermi || 1994 BE ||  || January 19, 1994 || Farra d'Isonzo || Farra d'Isonzo || — || align=right | 9.3 km || 
|-id=104 bgcolor=#d6d6d6
| 8104 Kumamori ||  ||  || January 19, 1994 || Oizumi || T. Kobayashi || EOS || align=right | 9.4 km || 
|-id=105 bgcolor=#fefefe
| 8105 ||  || — || November 28, 1994 || Kushiro || S. Ueda, H. Kaneda || — || align=right | 4.7 km || 
|-id=106 bgcolor=#fefefe
| 8106 Carpino || 1994 YB ||  || December 23, 1994 || Sormano || M. Cavagna, P. Sicoli || CHL || align=right | 12 km || 
|-id=107 bgcolor=#fefefe
| 8107 ||  || — || January 31, 1995 || Nachi-Katsuura || Y. Shimizu, T. Urata || — || align=right | 4.6 km || 
|-id=108 bgcolor=#fefefe
| 8108 Wieland ||  ||  || January 30, 1995 || Tautenburg Observatory || F. Börngen || V || align=right | 4.5 km || 
|-id=109 bgcolor=#fefefe
| 8109 Danielwilliam ||  ||  || February 25, 1995 || Catalina Station || C. W. Hergenrother || PHOslow || align=right | 4.5 km || 
|-id=110 bgcolor=#E9E9E9
| 8110 Heath ||  ||  || February 27, 1995 || Oizumi || T. Kobayashi || — || align=right | 5.9 km || 
|-id=111 bgcolor=#E9E9E9
| 8111 Hoepli || 1995 GE ||  || April 2, 1995 || Sormano || A. Testa, V. Giuliani || EUN || align=right | 5.6 km || 
|-id=112 bgcolor=#d6d6d6
| 8112 Cesi || 1995 JJ ||  || May 3, 1995 || Stroncone || Santa Lucia Obs. || — || align=right | 8.5 km || 
|-id=113 bgcolor=#fefefe
| 8113 Matsue ||  ||  || April 21, 1996 || Yatsuka || R. H. McNaught, H. Abe || FLO || align=right | 3.2 km || 
|-id=114 bgcolor=#fefefe
| 8114 Lafcadio ||  ||  || April 24, 1996 || Yatsuka || H. Abe || V || align=right | 2.4 km || 
|-id=115 bgcolor=#fefefe
| 8115 Sakabe ||  ||  || April 24, 1996 || Moriyama || R. H. McNaught, Y. Ikari || FLO || align=right | 3.7 km || 
|-id=116 bgcolor=#fefefe
| 8116 Jeanperrin ||  ||  || April 17, 1996 || La Silla || E. W. Elst || FLOmoon || align=right | 4.8 km || 
|-id=117 bgcolor=#d6d6d6
| 8117 Yuanlongping ||  ||  || September 18, 1996 || Xinglong || SCAP || — || align=right | 10 km || 
|-id=118 bgcolor=#E9E9E9
| 8118 ||  || — || November 26, 1996 || Xinglong || SCAP || EUN || align=right | 6.8 km || 
|-id=119 bgcolor=#d6d6d6
| 8119 ||  || — || October 12, 1997 || Xinglong || SCAP || — || align=right | 5.0 km || 
|-id=120 bgcolor=#fefefe
| 8120 Kobe || 1997 VT ||  || November 2, 1997 || Yatsuka || H. Abe || MAS || align=right | 3.1 km || 
|-id=121 bgcolor=#fefefe
| 8121 Altdorfer || 2572 P-L ||  || September 24, 1960 || Palomar || PLS || — || align=right | 2.5 km || 
|-id=122 bgcolor=#fefefe
| 8122 Holbein || 4038 P-L ||  || September 24, 1960 || Palomar || PLS || NYS || align=right | 3.5 km || 
|-id=123 bgcolor=#fefefe
| 8123 Canaletto || 3138 T-1 ||  || March 26, 1971 || Palomar || PLS || — || align=right | 3.0 km || 
|-id=124 bgcolor=#fefefe
| 8124 Guardi || 4370 T-1 ||  || March 26, 1971 || Palomar || PLS || — || align=right | 2.5 km || 
|-id=125 bgcolor=#C2FFFF
| 8125 Tyndareus || 5493 T-2 ||  || September 30, 1973 || Palomar || PLS || L4 || align=right | 27 km || 
|-id=126 bgcolor=#E9E9E9
| 8126 Chanwainam || 1966 BL ||  || January 20, 1966 || Nanking || Purple Mountain Obs. || DOR || align=right | 14 km || 
|-id=127 bgcolor=#E9E9E9
| 8127 Beuf || 1967 HA ||  || April 27, 1967 || El Leoncito || C. U. Cesco || MAR || align=right | 5.2 km || 
|-id=128 bgcolor=#d6d6d6
| 8128 Nicomachus || 1967 JP ||  || May 6, 1967 || El Leoncito || C. U. Cesco, A. R. Klemola || HYG || align=right | 16 km || 
|-id=129 bgcolor=#fefefe
| 8129 Michaelbusch ||  ||  || September 30, 1975 || Palomar || S. J. Bus || — || align=right | 4.1 km || 
|-id=130 bgcolor=#d6d6d6
| 8130 Seeberg ||  ||  || February 27, 1976 || Tautenburg Observatory || F. Börngen || 3:2 || align=right | 24 km || 
|-id=131 bgcolor=#E9E9E9
| 8131 Scanlon || 1976 SC ||  || September 27, 1976 || Palomar || E. F. Helin || RAF || align=right | 6.4 km || 
|-id=132 bgcolor=#E9E9E9
| 8132 Vitginzburg ||  ||  || December 18, 1976 || Nauchnij || L. I. Chernykh || EUN || align=right | 11 km || 
|-id=133 bgcolor=#d6d6d6
| 8133 Takanochoei ||  ||  || February 18, 1977 || Kiso || H. Kosai, K. Furukawa || THM || align=right | 14 km || 
|-id=134 bgcolor=#fefefe
| 8134 Minin ||  ||  || September 26, 1978 || Nauchnij || L. V. Zhuravleva || — || align=right | 4.0 km || 
|-id=135 bgcolor=#fefefe
| 8135 Davidmitchell ||  ||  || November 7, 1978 || Palomar || E. F. Helin, S. J. Bus || — || align=right | 4.9 km || 
|-id=136 bgcolor=#d6d6d6
| 8136 Landis ||  ||  || June 25, 1979 || Siding Spring || E. F. Helin, S. J. Bus || — || align=right | 8.6 km || 
|-id=137 bgcolor=#fefefe
| 8137 Kvíz || 1979 SJ ||  || September 19, 1979 || Kleť || Kleť Obs. || — || align=right | 3.2 km || 
|-id=138 bgcolor=#fefefe
| 8138 Craigbowers ||  ||  || March 20, 1980 || Bickley || Perth Obs. || — || align=right | 3.3 km || 
|-id=139 bgcolor=#fefefe
| 8139 Paulabell ||  ||  || October 31, 1980 || Palomar || S. J. Bus || FLO || align=right | 2.9 km || 
|-id=140 bgcolor=#E9E9E9
| 8140 Hardersen ||  ||  || March 1, 1981 || Siding Spring || S. J. Bus || — || align=right | 8.2 km || 
|-id=141 bgcolor=#fefefe
| 8141 Nikolaev ||  ||  || September 20, 1982 || Nauchnij || N. S. Chernykh || — || align=right | 4.4 km || 
|-id=142 bgcolor=#fefefe
| 8142 Zolotov ||  ||  || October 20, 1982 || Nauchnij || L. G. Karachkina || NYS || align=right | 4.0 km || 
|-id=143 bgcolor=#fefefe
| 8143 Nezval || 1982 VN ||  || November 11, 1982 || Kleť || A. Mrkos || NYS || align=right | 3.8 km || 
|-id=144 bgcolor=#d6d6d6
| 8144 Hiragagennai ||  ||  || November 14, 1982 || Kiso || H. Kosai, K. Furukawa || KOR || align=right | 6.6 km || 
|-id=145 bgcolor=#E9E9E9
| 8145 Valujki ||  ||  || September 5, 1983 || Nauchnij || L. V. Zhuravleva || — || align=right | 7.0 km || 
|-id=146 bgcolor=#E9E9E9
| 8146 Jimbell || 1983 WG ||  || November 28, 1983 || Anderson Mesa || E. Bowell || — || align=right | 19 km || 
|-id=147 bgcolor=#E9E9E9
| 8147 Colemanhawkins ||  ||  || September 28, 1984 || Anderson Mesa || B. A. Skiff || — || align=right | 8.8 km || 
|-id=148 bgcolor=#fefefe
| 8148 Golding ||  ||  || February 15, 1985 || La Silla || H. Debehogne || — || align=right | 3.8 km || 
|-id=149 bgcolor=#fefefe
| 8149 Ruff ||  ||  || May 11, 1985 || Palomar || C. S. Shoemaker, E. M. Shoemaker || — || align=right | 4.1 km || 
|-id=150 bgcolor=#d6d6d6
| 8150 Kaluga ||  ||  || August 24, 1985 || Nauchnij || N. S. Chernykh || — || align=right | 13 km || 
|-id=151 bgcolor=#fefefe
| 8151 Andranada ||  ||  || August 12, 1986 || Nauchnij || L. V. Zhuravleva || — || align=right | 5.4 km || 
|-id=152 bgcolor=#fefefe
| 8152 Martinlee || 1986 VY ||  || November 3, 1986 || Kleť || A. Mrkos || ERI || align=right | 7.9 km || 
|-id=153 bgcolor=#fefefe
| 8153 Gattacceca ||  ||  || November 25, 1986 || Kleť || A. Mrkos || NYS || align=right | 4.9 km || 
|-id=154 bgcolor=#fefefe
| 8154 Stahl ||  ||  || February 15, 1988 || La Silla || E. W. Elst || — || align=right | 2.8 km || 
|-id=155 bgcolor=#E9E9E9
| 8155 Battaglini || 1988 QA ||  || August 17, 1988 || Bologna || San Vittore Obs. || MIS || align=right | 9.6 km || 
|-id=156 bgcolor=#E9E9E9
| 8156 Tsukada || 1988 TR ||  || October 13, 1988 || Kitami || K. Endate, K. Watanabe || HEN || align=right | 6.0 km || 
|-id=157 bgcolor=#E9E9E9
| 8157 ||  || — || December 15, 1988 || Gekko || Y. Oshima || DOR || align=right | 12 km || 
|-id=158 bgcolor=#E9E9E9
| 8158 Herder ||  ||  || October 23, 1989 || Tautenburg Observatory || F. Börngen || — || align=right | 5.1 km || 
|-id=159 bgcolor=#E9E9E9
| 8159 Fukuoka ||  ||  || January 24, 1990 || Kitami || K. Endate, K. Watanabe || — || align=right | 6.8 km || 
|-id=160 bgcolor=#fefefe
| 8160 || 1990 MG || — || June 21, 1990 || Palomar || H. E. Holt || — || align=right | 4.4 km || 
|-id=161 bgcolor=#d6d6d6
| 8161 Newman ||  ||  || August 19, 1990 || Harvard Observatory || Oak Ridge Observatory || THM || align=right | 11 km || 
|-id=162 bgcolor=#fefefe
| 8162 ||  || — || September 16, 1990 || Palomar || H. E. Holt || — || align=right | 4.4 km || 
|-id=163 bgcolor=#fefefe
| 8163 Ishizaki ||  ||  || October 27, 1990 || Geisei || T. Seki || — || align=right | 5.0 km || 
|-id=164 bgcolor=#fefefe
| 8164 Andreasdoppler ||  ||  || October 16, 1990 || La Silla || E. W. Elst || FLO || align=right | 3.7 km || 
|-id=165 bgcolor=#fefefe
| 8165 Gnädig ||  ||  || November 21, 1990 || La Silla || E. W. Elst || — || align=right | 5.0 km || 
|-id=166 bgcolor=#fefefe
| 8166 Buczynski ||  ||  || January 12, 1991 || Stakenbridge || B. G. W. Manning || NYS || align=right | 3.7 km || 
|-id=167 bgcolor=#fefefe
| 8167 Ishii ||  ||  || February 14, 1991 || Kitami || K. Endate, K. Watanabe || — || align=right | 5.5 km || 
|-id=168 bgcolor=#fefefe
| 8168 Rogerbourke ||  ||  || March 18, 1991 || Palomar || E. F. Helin || PHO || align=right | 4.3 km || 
|-id=169 bgcolor=#d6d6d6
| 8169 Mirabeau ||  ||  || August 2, 1991 || La Silla || E. W. Elst || — || align=right | 11 km || 
|-id=170 bgcolor=#E9E9E9
| 8170 ||  || — || August 7, 1991 || Palomar || H. E. Holt || EUN || align=right | 6.9 km || 
|-id=171 bgcolor=#d6d6d6
| 8171 Stauffenberg ||  ||  || September 5, 1991 || Tautenburg Observatory || F. Börngen, L. D. Schmadel || EOS || align=right | 8.8 km || 
|-id=172 bgcolor=#d6d6d6
| 8172 ||  || — || September 15, 1991 || Palomar || H. E. Holt || THM || align=right | 13 km || 
|-id=173 bgcolor=#d6d6d6
| 8173 ||  || — || September 11, 1991 || Palomar || H. E. Holt || slow || align=right | 8.1 km || 
|-id=174 bgcolor=#d6d6d6
| 8174 ||  || — || September 17, 1991 || Palomar || H. E. Holt || — || align=right | 23 km || 
|-id=175 bgcolor=#d6d6d6
| 8175 Boerhaave ||  ||  || November 2, 1991 || La Silla || E. W. Elst || — || align=right | 9.8 km || 
|-id=176 bgcolor=#FFC2E0
| 8176 || 1991 WA || — || November 29, 1991 || Siding Spring || R. H. McNaught || APO +1km || align=right | 1.5 km || 
|-id=177 bgcolor=#fefefe
| 8177 || 1992 BO || — || January 28, 1992 || Kushiro || S. Ueda, H. Kaneda || FLO || align=right | 5.0 km || 
|-id=178 bgcolor=#fefefe
| 8178 ||  || — || February 29, 1992 || La Silla || UESAC || — || align=right | 3.6 km || 
|-id=179 bgcolor=#fefefe
| 8179 ||  || — || March 1, 1992 || La Silla || UESAC || — || align=right | 4.3 km || 
|-id=180 bgcolor=#E9E9E9
| 8180 ||  || — || August 6, 1992 || Palomar || H. E. Holt || — || align=right | 13 km || 
|-id=181 bgcolor=#E9E9E9
| 8181 Rossini ||  ||  || September 28, 1992 || Nauchnij || L. V. Zhuravleva || — || align=right | 11 km || 
|-id=182 bgcolor=#d6d6d6
| 8182 Akita || 1992 TX ||  || October 1, 1992 || Kitami || M. Yanai, K. Watanabe || KOR || align=right | 7.1 km || 
|-id=183 bgcolor=#d6d6d6
| 8183 ||  || — || October 22, 1992 || Kushiro || S. Ueda, H. Kaneda || KORfast? || align=right | 7.2 km || 
|-id=184 bgcolor=#d6d6d6
| 8184 Luderic || 1992 WL ||  || November 16, 1992 || Kushiro || S. Ueda, H. Kaneda || EOS || align=right | 12 km || 
|-id=185 bgcolor=#d6d6d6
| 8185 ||  || — || November 18, 1992 || Kushiro || S. Ueda, H. Kaneda || KOR || align=right | 6.8 km || 
|-id=186 bgcolor=#d6d6d6
| 8186 ||  || — || November 17, 1992 || Dynic || A. Sugie || EOS || align=right | 9.9 km || 
|-id=187 bgcolor=#d6d6d6
| 8187 Akiramisawa || 1992 XL ||  || December 15, 1992 || Kiyosato || S. Otomo || EOS || align=right | 9.3 km || 
|-id=188 bgcolor=#d6d6d6
| 8188 Okegaya ||  ||  || December 18, 1992 || Kani || Y. Mizuno, T. Furuta || — || align=right | 20 km || 
|-id=189 bgcolor=#d6d6d6
| 8189 Naruke ||  ||  || December 30, 1992 || Okutama || T. Hioki, S. Hayakawa || — || align=right | 16 km || 
|-id=190 bgcolor=#fefefe
| 8190 Bouguer ||  ||  || July 20, 1993 || La Silla || E. W. Elst || — || align=right | 3.6 km || 
|-id=191 bgcolor=#fefefe
| 8191 Mersenne ||  ||  || July 20, 1993 || La Silla || E. W. Elst || — || align=right | 2.9 km || 
|-id=192 bgcolor=#fefefe
| 8192 Tonucci || 1993 RB ||  || September 10, 1993 || Stroncone || Santa Lucia Obs. || — || align=right | 2.5 km || 
|-id=193 bgcolor=#fefefe
| 8193 Ciaurro || 1993 SF ||  || September 17, 1993 || Stroncone || Santa Lucia Obs. || FLO || align=right | 1.6 km || 
|-id=194 bgcolor=#fefefe
| 8194 Satake ||  ||  || September 16, 1993 || Kitami || K. Endate, K. Watanabe || — || align=right | 6.7 km || 
|-id=195 bgcolor=#fefefe
| 8195 ||  || — || October 19, 1993 || Palomar || E. F. Helin || — || align=right | 8.1 km || 
|-id=196 bgcolor=#fefefe
| 8196 ||  || — || October 16, 1993 || Palomar || E. F. Helin || V || align=right | 4.6 km || 
|-id=197 bgcolor=#E9E9E9
| 8197 Mizunohiroshi || 1993 VX ||  || November 15, 1993 || Oizumi || T. Kobayashi || — || align=right | 14 km || 
|-id=198 bgcolor=#E9E9E9
| 8198 ||  || — || November 11, 1993 || Kushiro || S. Ueda, H. Kaneda || — || align=right | 5.0 km || 
|-id=199 bgcolor=#E9E9E9
| 8199 Takagitakeo || 1993 XR ||  || December 9, 1993 || Oizumi || T. Kobayashi || — || align=right | 5.4 km || 
|-id=200 bgcolor=#E9E9E9
| 8200 Souten ||  ||  || January 7, 1994 || Nyukasa || M. Hirasawa, S. Suzuki || — || align=right | 7.6 km || 
|}

8201–8300 

|-bgcolor=#FFC2E0
| 8201 ||  || — || January 5, 1994 || Siding Spring || G. J. Garradd || APO +1km || align=right | 1.9 km || 
|-id=202 bgcolor=#d6d6d6
| 8202 Gooley ||  ||  || February 11, 1994 || Kitami || K. Endate, K. Watanabe || — || align=right | 6.5 km || 
|-id=203 bgcolor=#d6d6d6
| 8203 Jogolehmann ||  ||  || February 7, 1994 || La Silla || E. W. Elst || HYG || align=right | 14 km || 
|-id=204 bgcolor=#d6d6d6
| 8204 Takabatake ||  ||  || April 8, 1994 || Kitami || K. Endate, K. Watanabe || THM || align=right | 14 km || 
|-id=205 bgcolor=#d6d6d6
| 8205 Van Dijck ||  ||  || August 10, 1994 || La Silla || E. W. Elst || THM || align=right | 13 km || 
|-id=206 bgcolor=#fefefe
| 8206 Masayuki ||  ||  || November 27, 1994 || Oizumi || T. Kobayashi || — || align=right | 3.7 km || 
|-id=207 bgcolor=#fefefe
| 8207 Suminao ||  ||  || December 31, 1994 || Oizumi || T. Kobayashi || — || align=right | 2.8 km || 
|-id=208 bgcolor=#E9E9E9
| 8208 Volta ||  ||  || February 28, 1995 || Sormano || P. Sicoli, P. Ghezzi || — || align=right | 9.3 km || 
|-id=209 bgcolor=#E9E9E9
| 8209 Toscanelli ||  ||  || February 28, 1995 || Sormano || P. Sicoli, P. Ghezzi || — || align=right | 8.8 km || 
|-id=210 bgcolor=#fefefe
| 8210 NANTEN || 1995 EH ||  || March 5, 1995 || Oizumi || T. Kobayashi || — || align=right | 5.5 km || 
|-id=211 bgcolor=#fefefe
| 8211 ||  || — || March 5, 1995 || Kushiro || S. Ueda, H. Kaneda || NYS || align=right | 4.8 km || 
|-id=212 bgcolor=#fefefe
| 8212 Naoshigetani ||  ||  || March 6, 1995 || Kiyosato || S. Otomo || NYS || align=right | 4.5 km || 
|-id=213 bgcolor=#fefefe
| 8213 || 1995 FE || — || March 26, 1995 || Nachi-Katsuura || Y. Shimizu, T. Urata || PHO || align=right | 4.6 km || 
|-id=214 bgcolor=#E9E9E9
| 8214 Mirellalilli || 1995 FH ||  || March 29, 1995 || La Silla || S. Mottola || — || align=right | 9.7 km || 
|-id=215 bgcolor=#fefefe
| 8215 Zanonato || 1995 FZ ||  || March 31, 1995 || Nachi-Katsuura || Y. Shimizu, T. Urata || — || align=right | 3.6 km || 
|-id=216 bgcolor=#E9E9E9
| 8216 Melosh ||  ||  || March 27, 1995 || Kitt Peak || Spacewatch || — || align=right | 3.1 km || 
|-id=217 bgcolor=#fefefe
| 8217 Dominikhašek || 1995 HC ||  || April 21, 1995 || Ondřejov || P. Pravec, L. Kotková || — || align=right | 3.0 km || 
|-id=218 bgcolor=#fefefe
| 8218 Hosty || 1996 JH ||  || May 8, 1996 || Siding Spring || R. H. McNaught || FLO || align=right | 2.2 km || 
|-id=219 bgcolor=#E9E9E9
| 8219 || 1996 JL || — || May 10, 1996 || Chiyoda || R. H. McNaught, T. Kojima || GEF || align=right | 8.1 km || 
|-id=220 bgcolor=#fefefe
| 8220 Nanyou ||  ||  || May 13, 1996 || Nanyo || T. Okuni || — || align=right | 2.6 km || 
|-id=221 bgcolor=#d6d6d6
| 8221 La Condamine ||  ||  || July 14, 1996 || La Silla || E. W. Elst || KOR || align=right | 6.1 km || 
|-id=222 bgcolor=#fefefe
| 8222 Gellner || 1996 OX ||  || July 22, 1996 || Kleť || M. Tichý, Z. Moravec || — || align=right | 3.6 km || 
|-id=223 bgcolor=#E9E9E9
| 8223 Bradshaw || 1996 PD ||  || August 6, 1996 || Prescott || P. G. Comba || — || align=right | 9.2 km || 
|-id=224 bgcolor=#E9E9E9
| 8224 Fultonwright || 1996 PE ||  || August 6, 1996 || Prescott || P. G. Comba || — || align=right | 5.3 km || 
|-id=225 bgcolor=#d6d6d6
| 8225 Emerson || 1996 QC ||  || August 16, 1996 || Portimão || C. F. Durman, B. M. Ewen-Smith || — || align=right | 7.1 km || 
|-id=226 bgcolor=#d6d6d6
| 8226 ||  || — || October 5, 1996 || Nachi-Katsuura || Y. Shimizu, T. Urata || EOS || align=right | 12 km || 
|-id=227 bgcolor=#d6d6d6
| 8227 ||  || — || November 8, 1996 || Xinglong || SCAP || — || align=right | 12 km || 
|-id=228 bgcolor=#E9E9E9
| 8228 ||  || — || December 22, 1996 || Xinglong || SCAP || ADE || align=right | 8.3 km || 
|-id=229 bgcolor=#d6d6d6
| 8229 Kozelský ||  ||  || December 28, 1996 || Ondřejov || M. Wolf, L. Kotková || — || align=right | 13 km || 
|-id=230 bgcolor=#fefefe
| 8230 Perona ||  ||  || October 8, 1997 || Stroncone || Santa Lucia Obs. || — || align=right | 2.9 km || 
|-id=231 bgcolor=#d6d6d6
| 8231 Tetsujiyamada ||  ||  || October 6, 1997 || Kitami || K. Endate, K. Watanabe || — || align=right | 7.3 km || 
|-id=232 bgcolor=#fefefe
| 8232 Akiramizuno ||  ||  || October 26, 1997 || Oizumi || T. Kobayashi || NYS || align=right | 5.3 km || 
|-id=233 bgcolor=#fefefe
| 8233 Asada ||  ||  || November 5, 1997 || Oizumi || T. Kobayashi || ERI || align=right | 10 km || 
|-id=234 bgcolor=#d6d6d6
| 8234 Nobeoka ||  ||  || November 3, 1997 || Geisei || T. Seki || KOR || align=right | 8.5 km || 
|-id=235 bgcolor=#fefefe
| 8235 Fragonard || 2096 P-L ||  || September 24, 1960 || Palomar || PLS || CLA || align=right | 6.7 km || 
|-id=236 bgcolor=#E9E9E9
| 8236 Gainsborough || 4040 P-L ||  || September 24, 1960 || Palomar || PLS || DOR || align=right | 6.1 km || 
|-id=237 bgcolor=#fefefe
| 8237 Constable || 7581 P-L ||  || October 17, 1960 || Palomar || PLS || — || align=right | 3.9 km || 
|-id=238 bgcolor=#E9E9E9
| 8238 Courbet || 4232 T-1 ||  || March 26, 1971 || Palomar || PLS || DOR || align=right | 8.6 km || 
|-id=239 bgcolor=#d6d6d6
| 8239 Signac || 1153 T-2 ||  || September 29, 1973 || Palomar || PLS || THM || align=right | 10 km || 
|-id=240 bgcolor=#fefefe
| 8240 Matisse || 4172 T-2 ||  || September 29, 1973 || Palomar || PLS || — || align=right | 4.2 km || 
|-id=241 bgcolor=#C2FFFF
| 8241 Agrius ||  ||  || September 19, 1973 || Palomar || PLS || L4 || align=right | 27 km || 
|-id=242 bgcolor=#d6d6d6
| 8242 Joshemery ||  ||  || September 30, 1975 || Palomar || S. J. Bus || EOS || align=right | 8.8 km || 
|-id=243 bgcolor=#E9E9E9
| 8243 Devonburr ||  ||  || September 30, 1975 || Palomar || S. J. Bus || — || align=right | 5.7 km || 
|-id=244 bgcolor=#fefefe
| 8244 Mikolaichuk ||  ||  || October 3, 1975 || Nauchnij || L. I. Chernykh || — || align=right | 3.6 km || 
|-id=245 bgcolor=#fefefe
| 8245 Molnar ||  ||  || September 8, 1977 || Palomar || S. J. Bus || NYS || align=right | 3.6 km || 
|-id=246 bgcolor=#fefefe
| 8246 Kotov ||  ||  || August 20, 1979 || Nauchnij || N. S. Chernykh || FLO || align=right | 3.4 km || 
|-id=247 bgcolor=#d6d6d6
| 8247 Cherylhall ||  ||  || September 20, 1979 || Palomar || S. J. Bus || — || align=right | 15 km || 
|-id=248 bgcolor=#fefefe
| 8248 Gurzuf ||  ||  || October 14, 1979 || Nauchnij || N. S. Chernykh || — || align=right | 3.4 km || 
|-id=249 bgcolor=#fefefe
| 8249 Gershwin || 1980 GG ||  || April 13, 1980 || Kleť || A. Mrkos || — || align=right | 7.1 km || 
|-id=250 bgcolor=#d6d6d6
| 8250 Cornell || 1980 RP ||  || September 2, 1980 || Anderson Mesa || E. Bowell || TIR || align=right | 9.0 km || 
|-id=251 bgcolor=#FA8072
| 8251 Isogai || 1980 VA ||  || November 8, 1980 || Tōkai || T. Furuta || — || align=right | 4.3 km || 
|-id=252 bgcolor=#fefefe
| 8252 Elkins-Tanton ||  ||  || March 1, 1981 || Siding Spring || S. J. Bus || — || align=right | 3.3 km || 
|-id=253 bgcolor=#fefefe
| 8253 Brunetto ||  ||  || March 1, 1981 || Siding Spring || S. J. Bus || FLO || align=right | 2.0 km || 
|-id=254 bgcolor=#fefefe
| 8254 Moskovitz ||  ||  || March 2, 1981 || Siding Spring || S. J. Bus || — || align=right | 2.5 km || 
|-id=255 bgcolor=#E9E9E9
| 8255 Masiero ||  ||  || March 2, 1981 || Siding Spring || S. J. Bus || — || align=right | 6.5 km || 
|-id=256 bgcolor=#FA8072
| 8256 Shenzhou ||  ||  || October 25, 1981 || Nanking || Purple Mountain Obs. || — || align=right | 5.3 km || 
|-id=257 bgcolor=#fefefe
| 8257 Andycheng ||  ||  || April 28, 1982 || Anderson Mesa || E. Bowell || — || align=right | 4.2 km || 
|-id=258 bgcolor=#fefefe
| 8258 McCracken ||  ||  || September 15, 1982 || Kleť || A. Mrkos || FLO || align=right | 3.4 km || 
|-id=259 bgcolor=#fefefe
| 8259 || 1983 UG || — || October 16, 1983 || Kleť || Z. Vávrová || — || align=right | 4.8 km || 
|-id=260 bgcolor=#fefefe
| 8260 Momcheva || 1984 SH ||  || September 23, 1984 || Smolyan || Bulgarian National Obs. || — || align=right | 3.9 km || 
|-id=261 bgcolor=#d6d6d6
| 8261 Ceciliejulie || 1985 RD ||  || September 11, 1985 || Brorfelde || Copenhagen Obs. || THM || align=right | 11 km || 
|-id=262 bgcolor=#fefefe
| 8262 Carcich || 1985 RG ||  || September 14, 1985 || Anderson Mesa || E. Bowell || MAS || align=right | 3.2 km || 
|-id=263 bgcolor=#fefefe
| 8263 || 1986 QT || — || August 26, 1986 || La Silla || H. Debehogne || — || align=right | 4.0 km || 
|-id=264 bgcolor=#fefefe
| 8264 ||  || — || August 29, 1986 || La Silla || H. Debehogne || — || align=right | 4.0 km || 
|-id=265 bgcolor=#fefefe
| 8265 ||  || — || September 1, 1986 || La Silla || H. Debehogne || FLO || align=right | 5.7 km || 
|-id=266 bgcolor=#fefefe
| 8266 Bertelli || 1986 TC ||  || October 1, 1986 || Bologna || San Vittore Obs. || — || align=right | 4.0 km || 
|-id=267 bgcolor=#fefefe
| 8267 Kiss ||  ||  || October 4, 1986 || Kleť || A. Mrkos || — || align=right | 3.2 km || 
|-id=268 bgcolor=#E9E9E9
| 8268 Goerdeler ||  ||  || September 29, 1987 || Tautenburg Observatory || F. Börngen || — || align=right | 7.8 km || 
|-id=269 bgcolor=#E9E9E9
| 8269 Calandrelli || 1988 QB ||  || August 17, 1988 || Bologna || San Vittore Obs. || — || align=right | 5.7 km || 
|-id=270 bgcolor=#fefefe
| 8270 Winslow || 1989 JF ||  || May 2, 1989 || Palomar || E. F. Helin || FLO || align=right | 3.9 km || 
|-id=271 bgcolor=#fefefe
| 8271 Imai || 1989 NY ||  || July 2, 1989 || Palomar || E. F. Helin || — || align=right | 5.8 km || 
|-id=272 bgcolor=#fefefe
| 8272 Iitatemura || 1989 SG ||  || September 24, 1989 || Kani || Y. Mizuno, T. Furuta || — || align=right | 7.2 km || 
|-id=273 bgcolor=#E9E9E9
| 8273 Apatheia ||  ||  || November 29, 1989 || Susono || M. Akiyama, T. Furuta || — || align=right | 4.8 km || 
|-id=274 bgcolor=#fefefe
| 8274 Soejima ||  ||  || October 15, 1990 || Kitami || K. Endate, K. Watanabe || — || align=right | 3.4 km || 
|-id=275 bgcolor=#fefefe
| 8275 Inca ||  ||  || November 11, 1990 || La Silla || E. W. Elst || — || align=right | 2.9 km || 
|-id=276 bgcolor=#fefefe
| 8276 Shigei || 1991 FL ||  || March 17, 1991 || Kiyosato || S. Otomo, O. Muramatsu || NYS || align=right | 4.6 km || 
|-id=277 bgcolor=#fefefe
| 8277 Machu-Picchu ||  ||  || April 8, 1991 || La Silla || E. W. Elst || — || align=right | 7.0 km || 
|-id=278 bgcolor=#E9E9E9
| 8278 || 1991 JJ || — || May 4, 1991 || Kani || Y. Mizuno, T. Furuta || EUN || align=right | 9.6 km || 
|-id=279 bgcolor=#d6d6d6
| 8279 Cuzco ||  ||  || August 6, 1991 || La Silla || E. W. Elst || KOR || align=right | 5.5 km || 
|-id=280 bgcolor=#d6d6d6
| 8280 Petergruber ||  ||  || August 7, 1991 || Palomar || H. E. Holt || — || align=right | 9.4 km || 
|-id=281 bgcolor=#E9E9E9
| 8281 ||  || — || August 8, 1991 || Palomar || H. E. Holt || — || align=right | 13 km || 
|-id=282 bgcolor=#d6d6d6
| 8282 Delp ||  ||  || September 10, 1991 || Tautenburg Observatory || F. Börngen || THM || align=right | 11 km || 
|-id=283 bgcolor=#E9E9E9
| 8283 Edinburgh || 1991 SV ||  || September 30, 1991 || Siding Spring || R. H. McNaught || — || align=right | 8.0 km || 
|-id=284 bgcolor=#d6d6d6
| 8284 Cranach ||  ||  || October 8, 1991 || Tautenburg Observatory || F. Börngen || — || align=right | 20 km || 
|-id=285 bgcolor=#d6d6d6
| 8285 ||  || — || October 31, 1991 || Kushiro || S. Ueda, H. Kaneda || — || align=right | 8.5 km || 
|-id=286 bgcolor=#fefefe
| 8286 Kouji ||  ||  || March 8, 1992 || Kitami || K. Endate, K. Watanabe || — || align=right | 4.6 km || 
|-id=287 bgcolor=#fefefe
| 8287 ||  || — || March 1, 1992 || La Silla || UESAC || — || align=right | 3.6 km || 
|-id=288 bgcolor=#fefefe
| 8288 ||  || — || March 1, 1992 || La Silla || UESAC || — || align=right | 3.4 km || 
|-id=289 bgcolor=#fefefe
| 8289 An-Eefje ||  ||  || May 3, 1992 || La Silla || H. Debehogne || — || align=right | 4.1 km || 
|-id=290 bgcolor=#E9E9E9
| 8290 || 1992 NP || — || July 2, 1992 || Palomar || E. F. Helin, L. Lee || EUN || align=right | 7.5 km || 
|-id=291 bgcolor=#E9E9E9
| 8291 Bingham ||  ||  || September 2, 1992 || La Silla || E. W. Elst || — || align=right | 4.1 km || 
|-id=292 bgcolor=#E9E9E9
| 8292 ||  || — || September 30, 1992 || Palomar || H. E. Holt || — || align=right | 12 km || 
|-id=293 bgcolor=#E9E9E9
| 8293 || 1992 UQ || — || October 19, 1992 || Kushiro || S. Ueda, H. Kaneda || — || align=right | 6.4 km || 
|-id=294 bgcolor=#d6d6d6
| 8294 Takayuki ||  ||  || October 26, 1992 || Kitami || K. Endate, K. Watanabe || EOS || align=right | 15 km || 
|-id=295 bgcolor=#E9E9E9
| 8295 Toshifukushima ||  ||  || October 26, 1992 || Kitami || K. Endate, K. Watanabe || GEF || align=right | 6.4 km || 
|-id=296 bgcolor=#d6d6d6
| 8296 Miyama || 1993 AD ||  || January 13, 1993 || Kitami || K. Endate, K. Watanabe || — || align=right | 15 km || 
|-id=297 bgcolor=#fefefe
| 8297 Gérardfaure ||  ||  || August 18, 1993 || Caussols || E. W. Elst || FLO || align=right | 2.8 km || 
|-id=298 bgcolor=#fefefe
| 8298 Loubna ||  ||  || September 22, 1993 || La Silla || H. Debehogne, E. W. Elst || — || align=right | 3.3 km || 
|-id=299 bgcolor=#fefefe
| 8299 Téaleoni ||  ||  || October 9, 1993 || La Silla || E. W. Elst || FLO || align=right | 2.7 km || 
|-id=300 bgcolor=#E9E9E9
| 8300 Iga ||  ||  || January 9, 1994 || Oizumi || T. Kobayashi || EUN || align=right | 4.0 km || 
|}

8301–8400 

|-bgcolor=#fefefe
| 8301 Haseyuji ||  ||  || January 30, 1995 || Oizumi || T. Kobayashi || NYS || align=right | 5.8 km || 
|-id=302 bgcolor=#fefefe
| 8302 Kazukin || 1995 CY ||  || February 3, 1995 || Oizumi || T. Kobayashi || FLO || align=right | 3.0 km || 
|-id=303 bgcolor=#fefefe
| 8303 Miyaji ||  ||  || February 9, 1995 || Oizumi || T. Kobayashi || — || align=right | 3.7 km || 
|-id=304 bgcolor=#fefefe
| 8304 Ryomichico ||  ||  || February 22, 1995 || Oizumi || T. Kobayashi || NYS || align=right | 4.9 km || 
|-id=305 bgcolor=#fefefe
| 8305 Teika ||  ||  || February 22, 1995 || Oizumi || T. Kobayashi || — || align=right | 4.9 km || 
|-id=306 bgcolor=#fefefe
| 8306 Shoko ||  ||  || February 24, 1995 || Kuma Kogen || A. Nakamura || FLOmoon || align=right | 2.5 km || 
|-id=307 bgcolor=#fefefe
| 8307 Peltan || 1995 EN ||  || March 5, 1995 || Kleť || J. Tichá || — || align=right | 2.4 km || 
|-id=308 bgcolor=#fefefe
| 8308 Julie-Mélissa ||  ||  || April 17, 1996 || La Silla || E. W. Elst || NYS || align=right | 3.0 km || 
|-id=309 bgcolor=#fefefe
| 8309 ||  || — || July 14, 1996 || Haleakalā || NEAT || — || align=right | 4.1 km || 
|-id=310 bgcolor=#fefefe
| 8310 Seelos ||  ||  || August 9, 1996 || Haleakalā || NEAT || — || align=right | 3.5 km || 
|-id=311 bgcolor=#fefefe
| 8311 Zhangdaning ||  ||  || October 3, 1996 || Xinglong || SCAP || — || align=right | 2.7 km || 
|-id=312 bgcolor=#d6d6d6
| 8312 ||  || — || October 15, 1996 || Nachi-Katsuura || Y. Shimizu, T. Urata || EOS || align=right | 9.2 km || 
|-id=313 bgcolor=#E9E9E9
| 8313 Christiansen ||  ||  || December 19, 1996 || Xinglong || SCAP || — || align=right | 5.2 km || 
|-id=314 bgcolor=#d6d6d6
| 8314 Tsuji ||  ||  || October 25, 1997 || Kitami || K. Endate, K. Watanabe || THM || align=right | 14 km || 
|-id=315 bgcolor=#fefefe
| 8315 Bajin ||  ||  || November 25, 1997 || Xinglong || SCAP || — || align=right | 6.1 km || 
|-id=316 bgcolor=#d6d6d6
| 8316 Wolkenstein || 3002 P-L ||  || September 24, 1960 || Palomar || PLS || EOS || align=right | 16 km || 
|-id=317 bgcolor=#C2FFFF
| 8317 Eurysaces || 4523 P-L ||  || September 24, 1960 || Palomar || PLS || L4 || align=right | 26 km || 
|-id=318 bgcolor=#d6d6d6
| 8318 Averroes || 1306 T-2 ||  || September 29, 1973 || Palomar || PLS || — || align=right | 10 km || 
|-id=319 bgcolor=#d6d6d6
| 8319 Antiphanes || 3365 T-2 ||  || September 25, 1973 || Palomar || PLS || THM || align=right | 10 km || 
|-id=320 bgcolor=#fefefe
| 8320 van Zee || 1955 RV ||  || September 13, 1955 || Brooklyn || Indiana University || NYS || align=right | 5.5 km || 
|-id=321 bgcolor=#E9E9E9
| 8321 Akim || 1977 EX ||  || March 13, 1977 || Nauchnij || N. S. Chernykh || EUN || align=right | 11 km || 
|-id=322 bgcolor=#d6d6d6
| 8322 Kononovich ||  ||  || September 5, 1978 || Nauchnij || N. S. Chernykh || THM || align=right | 12 km || 
|-id=323 bgcolor=#E9E9E9
| 8323 Krimigis || 1979 UH ||  || October 17, 1979 || Anderson Mesa || E. Bowell || — || align=right | 12 km || 
|-id=324 bgcolor=#fefefe
| 8324 Juliadeleón ||  ||  || February 28, 1981 || Siding Spring || S. J. Bus || — || align=right | 3.2 km || 
|-id=325 bgcolor=#d6d6d6
| 8325 Trigo-Rodriguez ||  ||  || March 2, 1981 || Siding Spring || S. J. Bus || — || align=right | 11 km || 
|-id=326 bgcolor=#fefefe
| 8326 Paulkling ||  ||  || May 6, 1981 || Palomar || C. S. Shoemaker, E. M. Shoemaker || NYS || align=right | 4.2 km || 
|-id=327 bgcolor=#E9E9E9
| 8327 Weihenmayer ||  ||  || May 6, 1981 || Palomar || C. S. Shoemaker, E. M. Shoemaker || MIS || align=right | 8.8 km || 
|-id=328 bgcolor=#fefefe
| 8328 Uyttenhove ||  ||  || August 23, 1981 || La Silla || H. Debehogne || — || align=right | 3.0 km || 
|-id=329 bgcolor=#d6d6d6
| 8329 Speckman ||  ||  || March 22, 1982 || La Silla || H. Debehogne || THM || align=right | 14 km || 
|-id=330 bgcolor=#d6d6d6
| 8330 Fitzroy ||  ||  || March 28, 1982 || La Silla || H. Debehogne || HYG || align=right | 13 km || 
|-id=331 bgcolor=#fefefe
| 8331 Dawkins ||  ||  || May 27, 1982 || Palomar || C. S. Shoemaker, S. J. Bus || — || align=right | 4.8 km || 
|-id=332 bgcolor=#fefefe
| 8332 Ivantsvetaev ||  ||  || October 14, 1982 || Nauchnij || L. V. Zhuravleva, L. G. Karachkina || — || align=right | 4.0 km || 
|-id=333 bgcolor=#E9E9E9
| 8333 Medina || 1982 VF ||  || November 7, 1982 || Kleť || A. Mrkos || — || align=right | 14 km || 
|-id=334 bgcolor=#E9E9E9
| 8334 || 1984 CF || — || February 10, 1984 || Palomar || J. Gibson || GEF || align=right | 7.8 km || 
|-id=335 bgcolor=#fefefe
| 8335 Sarton ||  ||  || February 28, 1984 || La Silla || H. Debehogne || — || align=right | 3.7 km || 
|-id=336 bgcolor=#d6d6d6
| 8336 Šafařík ||  ||  || September 27, 1984 || Kleť || A. Mrkos || — || align=right | 11 km || 
|-id=337 bgcolor=#d6d6d6
| 8337 ||  || — || September 22, 1984 || La Silla || H. Debehogne || THM || align=right | 10 km || 
|-id=338 bgcolor=#fefefe
| 8338 Ralhan ||  ||  || March 27, 1985 || Brorfelde || Copenhagen Obs. || — || align=right | 4.8 km || 
|-id=339 bgcolor=#d6d6d6
| 8339 Kosovichia ||  ||  || September 15, 1985 || Nauchnij || N. S. Chernykh || THM || align=right | 12 km || 
|-id=340 bgcolor=#d6d6d6
| 8340 Mumma ||  ||  || October 15, 1985 || Anderson Mesa || E. Bowell || EOS || align=right | 20 km || 
|-id=341 bgcolor=#fefefe
| 8341 || 1986 QQ || — || August 26, 1986 || La Silla || H. Debehogne || — || align=right | 4.2 km || 
|-id=342 bgcolor=#fefefe
| 8342 ||  || — || August 29, 1986 || La Silla || H. Debehogne || — || align=right | 6.4 km || 
|-id=343 bgcolor=#d6d6d6
| 8343 Tugendhat ||  ||  || October 4, 1986 || Kleť || A. Mrkos || KOR || align=right | 6.4 km || 
|-id=344 bgcolor=#fefefe
| 8344 Babette || 1987 BB ||  || January 25, 1987 || Ojima || T. Niijima, T. Urata || EUT || align=right | 2.7 km || 
|-id=345 bgcolor=#fefefe
| 8345 Ulmerspatz ||  ||  || January 22, 1987 || La Silla || E. W. Elst || PHO || align=right | 7.2 km || 
|-id=346 bgcolor=#d6d6d6
| 8346 ||  || — || February 26, 1987 || La Silla || H. Debehogne || THM || align=right | 13 km || 
|-id=347 bgcolor=#E9E9E9
| 8347 Lallaward || 1987 HK ||  || April 21, 1987 || Palomar || C. S. Shoemaker, E. M. Shoemaker || — || align=right | 5.4 km || 
|-id=348 bgcolor=#fefefe
| 8348 Bhattacharyya || 1988 BX ||  || January 26, 1988 || Kavalur || R. Rajamohan || H || align=right | 8.3 km || 
|-id=349 bgcolor=#fefefe
| 8349 ||  || — || February 19, 1988 || Gekko || Y. Oshima || FLO || align=right | 3.5 km || 
|-id=350 bgcolor=#E9E9E9
| 8350 || 1989 AG || — || January 2, 1989 || Okutama || T. Hioki, N. Kawasato || ADE || align=right | 12 km || 
|-id=351 bgcolor=#E9E9E9
| 8351 ||  || — || March 10, 1989 || Toyota || K. Suzuki, T. Furuta || — || align=right | 13 km || 
|-id=352 bgcolor=#fefefe
| 8352 || 1989 GE || — || April 6, 1989 || Kushiro || S. Ueda, H. Kaneda || — || align=right | 4.7 km || 
|-id=353 bgcolor=#d6d6d6
| 8353 Megryan ||  ||  || April 3, 1989 || La Silla || E. W. Elst || — || align=right | 6.5 km || 
|-id=354 bgcolor=#d6d6d6
| 8354 || 1989 RF || — || September 1, 1989 || Haute-Provence || E. W. Elst || HYG || align=right | 16 km || 
|-id=355 bgcolor=#FA8072
| 8355 Masuo ||  ||  || September 5, 1989 || Palomar || E. F. Helin || — || align=right | 3.9 km || 
|-id=356 bgcolor=#fefefe
| 8356 Wadhwa ||  ||  || September 3, 1989 || Palomar || C. S. Shoemaker, E. M. Shoemaker || PHO || align=right | 6.7 km || 
|-id=357 bgcolor=#fefefe
| 8357 O'Connor ||  ||  || September 25, 1989 || Harvard Observatory || Oak Ridge Observatory || — || align=right | 4.1 km || 
|-id=358 bgcolor=#fefefe
| 8358 Rickblakley ||  ||  || November 4, 1989 || Palomar || C. S. Shoemaker, D. H. Levy || NYS || align=right | 2.8 km || 
|-id=359 bgcolor=#fefefe
| 8359 || 1989 WD || — || November 19, 1989 || Kushiro || S. Ueda, H. Kaneda || V || align=right | 8.2 km || 
|-id=360 bgcolor=#E9E9E9
| 8360 ||  || — || March 26, 1990 || Dynic || A. Sugie || EUN || align=right | 10 km || 
|-id=361 bgcolor=#d6d6d6
| 8361 ||  || — || May 1, 1990 || Siding Spring || A. Żytkow, M. J. Irwin || KOR || align=right | 6.3 km || 
|-id=362 bgcolor=#d6d6d6
| 8362 ||  || — || August 22, 1990 || Palomar || H. E. Holt || — || align=right | 12 km || 
|-id=363 bgcolor=#d6d6d6
| 8363 || 1990 RV || — || September 13, 1990 || Palomar || C. M. Olmstead || THM || align=right | 14 km || 
|-id=364 bgcolor=#d6d6d6
| 8364 ||  || — || September 15, 1990 || Palomar || H. E. Holt || — || align=right | 11 km || 
|-id=365 bgcolor=#fefefe
| 8365 ||  || — || September 15, 1990 || Palomar || H. E. Holt || — || align=right | 3.0 km || 
|-id=366 bgcolor=#fefefe
| 8366 ||  || — || October 20, 1990 || Dynic || A. Sugie || — || align=right | 3.8 km || 
|-id=367 bgcolor=#fefefe
| 8367 Bokusui ||  ||  || October 23, 1990 || Geisei || T. Seki || FLO || align=right | 3.7 km || 
|-id=368 bgcolor=#fefefe
| 8368 Lamont || 1991 DM ||  || February 20, 1991 || Siding Spring || R. H. McNaught || EUT || align=right | 3.6 km || 
|-id=369 bgcolor=#E9E9E9
| 8369 Miyata || 1991 GR ||  || April 8, 1991 || Palomar || E. F. Helin || MAR || align=right | 9.3 km || 
|-id=370 bgcolor=#E9E9E9
| 8370 Vanlindt ||  ||  || September 4, 1991 || La Silla || E. W. Elst || — || align=right | 5.2 km || 
|-id=371 bgcolor=#E9E9E9
| 8371 Goven ||  ||  || October 2, 1991 || Palomar || C. P. de Saint-Aignan || — || align=right | 9.2 km || 
|-id=372 bgcolor=#d6d6d6
| 8372 ||  || — || November 9, 1991 || Kushiro || S. Ueda, H. Kaneda || EOS || align=right | 9.1 km || 
|-id=373 bgcolor=#B88A00
| 8373 Stephengould || 1992 AB ||  || January 1, 1992 || Palomar || C. S. Shoemaker, E. M. Shoemaker || 2:1Junusualmoon || align=right | 5.7 km || 
|-id=374 bgcolor=#d6d6d6
| 8374 Horohata ||  ||  || January 10, 1992 || Kiyosato || S. Otomo || THM || align=right | 15 km || 
|-id=375 bgcolor=#d6d6d6
| 8375 Kenzokohno ||  ||  || January 12, 1992 || Geisei || T. Seki || — || align=right | 13 km || 
|-id=376 bgcolor=#d6d6d6
| 8376 ||  || — || July 30, 1992 || La Silla || H. Debehogne, Á. López-G. || SHU3:2 || align=right | 28 km || 
|-id=377 bgcolor=#E9E9E9
| 8377 Elmerreese ||  ||  || September 23, 1992 || Kitami || K. Endate, K. Watanabe || — || align=right | 4.5 km || 
|-id=378 bgcolor=#E9E9E9
| 8378 Sweeney ||  ||  || September 23, 1992 || Palomar || E. F. Helin || — || align=right | 7.7 km || 
|-id=379 bgcolor=#E9E9E9
| 8379 Straczynski ||  ||  || September 27, 1992 || Kitt Peak || Spacewatch || — || align=right | 6.1 km || 
|-id=380 bgcolor=#E9E9E9
| 8380 Tooting ||  ||  || September 29, 1992 || Palomar || H. E. Holt || — || align=right | 10 km || 
|-id=381 bgcolor=#fefefe
| 8381 Hauptmann ||  ||  || September 21, 1992 || Tautenburg Observatory || F. Börngen || — || align=right | 5.7 km || 
|-id=382 bgcolor=#E9E9E9
| 8382 Mann ||  ||  || September 23, 1992 || Tautenburg Observatory || F. Börngen || — || align=right | 4.0 km || 
|-id=383 bgcolor=#E9E9E9
| 8383 ||  || — || October 25, 1992 || Okutama || T. Hioki, S. Hayakawa || — || align=right | 6.9 km || 
|-id=384 bgcolor=#fefefe
| 8384 || 1992 YB || — || December 16, 1992 || Oohira || T. Urata || V || align=right | 4.7 km || 
|-id=385 bgcolor=#d6d6d6
| 8385 || 1993 AN || — || January 13, 1993 || Kushiro || S. Ueda, H. Kaneda || THM || align=right | 12 km || 
|-id=386 bgcolor=#d6d6d6
| 8386 Vanvinckenroye ||  ||  || January 27, 1993 || Caussols || E. W. Elst || — || align=right | 5.7 km || 
|-id=387 bgcolor=#d6d6d6
| 8387 Fujimori || 1993 DO ||  || February 19, 1993 || Geisei || T. Seki || EOS || align=right | 11 km || 
|-id=388 bgcolor=#d6d6d6
| 8388 ||  || — || March 17, 1993 || La Silla || UESAC || KOR || align=right | 8.3 km || 
|-id=389 bgcolor=#d6d6d6
| 8389 ||  || — || March 19, 1993 || La Silla || UESAC || — || align=right | 10 km || 
|-id=390 bgcolor=#d6d6d6
| 8390 ||  || — || March 19, 1993 || La Silla || UESAC || — || align=right | 12 km || 
|-id=391 bgcolor=#d6d6d6
| 8391 Kring ||  ||  || April 20, 1993 || Kitt Peak || Spacewatch || — || align=right | 8.0 km || 
|-id=392 bgcolor=#fefefe
| 8392 || 1993 OP || — || July 18, 1993 || Palomar || E. F. Helin || — || align=right | 4.3 km || 
|-id=393 bgcolor=#fefefe
| 8393 Tetsumasakamoto ||  ||  || October 15, 1993 || Kitami || K. Endate, K. Watanabe || FLO || align=right | 5.3 km || 
|-id=394 bgcolor=#fefefe
| 8394 ||  || — || October 13, 1993 || Palomar || H. E. Holt || slow || align=right | 3.9 km || 
|-id=395 bgcolor=#fefefe
| 8395 Rembaut ||  ||  || October 9, 1993 || La Silla || E. W. Elst || — || align=right | 3.5 km || 
|-id=396 bgcolor=#fefefe
| 8396 ||  || — || October 19, 1993 || Palomar || E. F. Helin || — || align=right | 4.0 km || 
|-id=397 bgcolor=#E9E9E9
| 8397 Chiakitanaka || 1993 XO ||  || December 8, 1993 || Kiyosato || S. Otomo || EUN || align=right | 7.4 km || 
|-id=398 bgcolor=#fefefe
| 8398 Rubbia || 1993 XY ||  || December 12, 1993 || Farra d'Isonzo || Farra d'Isonzo || ERI || align=right | 5.0 km || 
|-id=399 bgcolor=#fefefe
| 8399 Wakamatsu || 1994 AD ||  || January 2, 1994 || Oizumi || T. Kobayashi || MAS || align=right | 5.8 km || 
|-id=400 bgcolor=#E9E9E9
| 8400 Tomizo || 1994 AQ ||  || January 4, 1994 || Oizumi || T. Kobayashi || EUN || align=right | 7.9 km || 
|}

8401–8500 

|-bgcolor=#E9E9E9
| 8401 Assirelli || 1994 DA ||  || February 16, 1994 || Farra d'Isonzo || Farra d'Isonzo || — || align=right | 4.8 km || 
|-id=402 bgcolor=#E9E9E9
| 8402 ||  || — || April 11, 1994 || Palomar || E. F. Helin || MIT || align=right | 9.8 km || 
|-id=403 bgcolor=#d6d6d6
| 8403 Minorushimizu || 1994 JG ||  || May 6, 1994 || Oizumi || T. Kobayashi || EOS || align=right | 8.9 km || 
|-id=404 bgcolor=#fefefe
| 8404 || 1995 AN || — || January 1, 1995 || Catalina Station || T. B. Spahr || H || align=right | 4.3 km || 
|-id=405 bgcolor=#C7FF8F
| 8405 Asbolus || 1995 GO ||  || April 5, 1995 || Spacewatch || Spacewatch || centaur || align=right | 66 km || 
|-id=406 bgcolor=#fefefe
| 8406 Iwaokusano || 1995 HJ ||  || April 20, 1995 || Kitami || K. Endate, K. Watanabe || — || align=right | 3.8 km || 
|-id=407 bgcolor=#fefefe
| 8407 Houlahan || 1995 ON ||  || July 25, 1995 || Prescott || P. G. Comba || FLO || align=right | 3.5 km || 
|-id=408 bgcolor=#d6d6d6
| 8408 Strom ||  ||  || September 18, 1995 || Kitt Peak || Spacewatch || THM || align=right | 8.3 km || 
|-id=409 bgcolor=#d6d6d6
| 8409 Valentaugustus ||  ||  || November 28, 1995 || Socorro || R. Weber || HYG || align=right | 15 km || 
|-id=410 bgcolor=#d6d6d6
| 8410 Hiroakiohno ||  ||  || August 24, 1996 || Kushiro || S. Ueda, H. Kaneda || THM || align=right | 13 km || 
|-id=411 bgcolor=#fefefe
| 8411 Celso || 1996 TO ||  || October 3, 1996 || Farra d'Isonzo || Farra d'Isonzo || — || align=right | 2.4 km || 
|-id=412 bgcolor=#fefefe
| 8412 Zhaozhongxian ||  ||  || October 7, 1996 || Xinglong || SCAP || MAS || align=right | 2.2 km || 
|-id=413 bgcolor=#fefefe
| 8413 Kawakami ||  ||  || October 9, 1996 || Kushiro || S. Ueda, H. Kaneda || — || align=right | 5.5 km || 
|-id=414 bgcolor=#fefefe
| 8414 Atsuko ||  ||  || October 9, 1996 || Kushiro || S. Ueda, H. Kaneda || — || align=right | 5.3 km || 
|-id=415 bgcolor=#d6d6d6
| 8415 || 1996 UT || — || October 16, 1996 || Nachi-Katsuura || Y. Shimizu, T. Urata || THM || align=right | 15 km || 
|-id=416 bgcolor=#fefefe
| 8416 Okada ||  ||  || November 3, 1996 || Kushiro || S. Ueda, H. Kaneda || — || align=right | 4.2 km || 
|-id=417 bgcolor=#fefefe
| 8417 Lancetaylor ||  ||  || November 7, 1996 || Kitami || K. Endate, K. Watanabe || FLO || align=right | 4.2 km || 
|-id=418 bgcolor=#E9E9E9
| 8418 Mogamigawa ||  ||  || November 10, 1996 || Nanyo || T. Okuni || — || align=right | 11 km || 
|-id=419 bgcolor=#E9E9E9
| 8419 Terumikazumi ||  ||  || November 7, 1996 || Kushiro || S. Ueda, H. Kaneda || — || align=right | 12 km || 
|-id=420 bgcolor=#E9E9E9
| 8420 Angrogna || 1996 WQ ||  || November 17, 1996 || Prescott || P. G. Comba || EUN || align=right | 7.1 km || 
|-id=421 bgcolor=#d6d6d6
| 8421 Montanari ||  ||  || December 2, 1996 || Bologna || San Vittore Obs. || KOR || align=right | 5.7 km || 
|-id=422 bgcolor=#d6d6d6
| 8422 Mohorovičıć ||  ||  || December 5, 1996 || Farra d'Isonzo || Farra d'Isonzo || — || align=right | 5.4 km || 
|-id=423 bgcolor=#d6d6d6
| 8423 Macao ||  ||  || January 11, 1997 || Xinglong || SCAP || — || align=right | 11 km || 
|-id=424 bgcolor=#fefefe
| 8424 Toshitsumita || 1997 CP ||  || February 1, 1997 || Oizumi || T. Kobayashi || NYS || align=right | 5.2 km || 
|-id=425 bgcolor=#fefefe
| 8425 Zirankexuejijin ||  ||  || February 14, 1997 || Xinglong || SCAP || — || align=right | 4.4 km || 
|-id=426 bgcolor=#fefefe
| 8426 || 1997 ST || — || September 16, 1997 || Xinglong || SCAP || — || align=right | 4.3 km || 
|-id=427 bgcolor=#d6d6d6
| 8427 ||  || — || October 6, 1997 || Nachi-Katsuura || Y. Shimizu, T. Urata || — || align=right | 17 km || 
|-id=428 bgcolor=#fefefe
| 8428 Okiko ||  ||  || November 3, 1997 || Geisei || T. Seki || NYS || align=right | 3.2 km || 
|-id=429 bgcolor=#d6d6d6
| 8429 ||  || — || December 23, 1997 || Xinglong || SCAP || HYG || align=right | 15 km || 
|-id=430 bgcolor=#E9E9E9
| 8430 Florey ||  ||  || December 25, 1997 || Woomera || F. B. Zoltowski || — || align=right | 9.3 km || 
|-id=431 bgcolor=#E9E9E9
| 8431 Haseda ||  ||  || December 31, 1997 || Oizumi || T. Kobayashi || — || align=right | 7.5 km || 
|-id=432 bgcolor=#d6d6d6
| 8432 Tamakasuga ||  ||  || December 27, 1997 || Kuma Kogen || A. Nakamura || THM || align=right | 11 km || 
|-id=433 bgcolor=#E9E9E9
| 8433 Brachyrhynchus || 2561 P-L ||  || September 24, 1960 || Palomar || PLS || — || align=right | 12 km || 
|-id=434 bgcolor=#d6d6d6
| 8434 Columbianus || 6571 P-L ||  || September 24, 1960 || Palomar || PLS || — || align=right | 10 km || 
|-id=435 bgcolor=#fefefe
| 8435 Anser || 6643 P-L ||  || September 26, 1960 || Palomar || PLS || — || align=right | 2.9 km || 
|-id=436 bgcolor=#d6d6d6
| 8436 Leucopsis || 2259 T-1 ||  || March 25, 1971 || Palomar || PLS || — || align=right | 9.6 km || 
|-id=437 bgcolor=#E9E9E9
| 8437 Bernicla || 3057 T-1 ||  || March 26, 1971 || Palomar || PLS || — || align=right | 2.8 km || 
|-id=438 bgcolor=#fefefe
| 8438 Marila || 4825 T-1 ||  || May 13, 1971 || Palomar || PLS || NYS || align=right | 3.8 km || 
|-id=439 bgcolor=#d6d6d6
| 8439 Albellus || 2034 T-2 ||  || September 29, 1973 || Palomar || PLS || — || align=right | 11 km || 
|-id=440 bgcolor=#E9E9E9
| 8440 Wigeon || 1017 T-3 ||  || October 17, 1977 || Palomar || PLS || GEF || align=right | 6.6 km || 
|-id=441 bgcolor=#fefefe
| 8441 Lapponica || 4008 T-3 ||  || October 16, 1977 || Palomar || PLS || — || align=right | 4.8 km || 
|-id=442 bgcolor=#fefefe
| 8442 Ostralegus || 4237 T-3 ||  || October 16, 1977 || Palomar || PLS || — || align=right | 3.1 km || 
|-id=443 bgcolor=#E9E9E9
| 8443 Svecica || 4343 T-3 ||  || October 16, 1977 || Palomar || PLS || — || align=right | 12 km || 
|-id=444 bgcolor=#FA8072
| 8444 Popovich ||  ||  || October 8, 1969 || Nauchnij || L. I. Chernykh || — || align=right | 4.7 km || 
|-id=445 bgcolor=#d6d6d6
| 8445 Novotroitskoe ||  ||  || August 31, 1973 || Nauchnij || T. M. Smirnova || — || align=right | 13 km || 
|-id=446 bgcolor=#fefefe
| 8446 Tazieff ||  ||  || September 28, 1973 || Nauchnij || N. S. Chernykh || MAS || align=right | 2.5 km || 
|-id=447 bgcolor=#fefefe
| 8447 Cornejo || 1974 OE ||  || July 16, 1974 || El Leoncito || Félix Aguilar Obs. || V || align=right | 3.4 km || 
|-id=448 bgcolor=#fefefe
| 8448 Belyakina ||  ||  || October 26, 1976 || Nauchnij || T. M. Smirnova || — || align=right | 3.9 km || 
|-id=449 bgcolor=#d6d6d6
| 8449 Maslovets ||  ||  || March 13, 1977 || Nauchnij || N. S. Chernykh || slow || align=right | 14 km || 
|-id=450 bgcolor=#E9E9E9
| 8450 Egorov ||  ||  || August 19, 1977 || Nauchnij || N. S. Chernykh || PAD || align=right | 11 km || 
|-id=451 bgcolor=#E9E9E9
| 8451 Gaidai ||  ||  || September 11, 1977 || Nauchnij || N. S. Chernykh || GEF || align=right | 5.1 km || 
|-id=452 bgcolor=#fefefe
| 8452 Clay || 1978 WB ||  || November 27, 1978 || Harvard Observatory || Harvard Obs. || MAS || align=right | 3.3 km || 
|-id=453 bgcolor=#d6d6d6
| 8453 Flaviataldini || 1981 EQ ||  || March 1, 1981 || La Silla || H. Debehogne, G. DeSanctis || — || align=right | 16 km || 
|-id=454 bgcolor=#E9E9E9
| 8454 Micheleferrero ||  ||  || March 5, 1981 || La Silla || H. Debehogne, G. DeSanctis || — || align=right | 10 km || 
|-id=455 bgcolor=#E9E9E9
| 8455 Johnrayner ||  ||  || March 6, 1981 || Siding Spring || S. J. Bus || — || align=right | 5.7 km || 
|-id=456 bgcolor=#d6d6d6
| 8456 Davegriep ||  ||  || March 1, 1981 || Siding Spring || S. J. Bus || — || align=right | 18 km || 
|-id=457 bgcolor=#E9E9E9
| 8457 Billgolisch ||  ||  || March 1, 1981 || Siding Spring || S. J. Bus || slow || align=right | 4.4 km || 
|-id=458 bgcolor=#fefefe
| 8458 Georgekoenig ||  ||  || March 1, 1981 || Siding Spring || S. J. Bus || — || align=right | 2.5 km || 
|-id=459 bgcolor=#d6d6d6
| 8459 Larsbergknut ||  ||  || March 2, 1981 || Siding Spring || S. J. Bus || THM || align=right | 10 km || 
|-id=460 bgcolor=#fefefe
| 8460 Imainamahoe ||  ||  || March 2, 1981 || Siding Spring || S. J. Bus || — || align=right | 3.2 km || 
|-id=461 bgcolor=#E9E9E9
| 8461 Sammiepung ||  ||  || March 2, 1981 || Siding Spring || S. J. Bus || — || align=right | 4.7 km || 
|-id=462 bgcolor=#E9E9E9
| 8462 Hazelsears ||  ||  || March 2, 1981 || Siding Spring || S. J. Bus || — || align=right | 3.7 km || 
|-id=463 bgcolor=#d6d6d6
| 8463 Naomimurdoch ||  ||  || March 2, 1981 || Siding Spring || S. J. Bus || THM || align=right | 7.1 km || 
|-id=464 bgcolor=#E9E9E9
| 8464 Polishook ||  ||  || March 2, 1981 || Siding Spring || S. J. Bus || — || align=right | 5.7 km || 
|-id=465 bgcolor=#d6d6d6
| 8465 Bancelin ||  ||  || March 2, 1981 || Siding Spring || S. J. Bus || — || align=right | 7.7 km || 
|-id=466 bgcolor=#E9E9E9
| 8466 Leyrat ||  ||  || March 2, 1981 || Siding Spring || S. J. Bus || — || align=right | 3.9 km || 
|-id=467 bgcolor=#d6d6d6
| 8467 Benoîtcarry ||  ||  || March 2, 1981 || Siding Spring || S. J. Bus || — || align=right | 6.4 km || 
|-id=468 bgcolor=#d6d6d6
| 8468 Rhondastroud ||  ||  || March 2, 1981 || Siding Spring || S. J. Bus || — || align=right | 6.8 km || 
|-id=469 bgcolor=#E9E9E9
| 8469 || 1981 TZ || — || October 5, 1981 || Anderson Mesa || N. G. Thomas || GEF || align=right | 7.5 km || 
|-id=470 bgcolor=#fefefe
| 8470 Dudinskaya ||  ||  || September 17, 1982 || Nauchnij || N. S. Chernykh || — || align=right | 5.0 km || 
|-id=471 bgcolor=#fefefe
| 8471 Obrant ||  ||  || September 5, 1983 || Nauchnij || L. V. Zhuravleva || FLO || align=right | 2.7 km || 
|-id=472 bgcolor=#E9E9E9
| 8472 Tarroni || 1983 TC ||  || October 12, 1983 || Bologna || San Vittore Obs. || EUN || align=right | 6.5 km || 
|-id=473 bgcolor=#d6d6d6
| 8473 ||  || — || September 21, 1984 || La Silla || H. Debehogne || HYG || align=right | 9.8 km || 
|-id=474 bgcolor=#fefefe
| 8474 Rettig ||  ||  || April 15, 1985 || Anderson Mesa || E. Bowell || FLOmoon || align=right | 4.2 km || 
|-id=475 bgcolor=#d6d6d6
| 8475 Vsevoivanov ||  ||  || August 13, 1985 || Nauchnij || N. S. Chernykh || — || align=right | 14 km || 
|-id=476 bgcolor=#fefefe
| 8476 ||  || — || August 28, 1986 || La Silla || H. Debehogne || — || align=right | 3.0 km || 
|-id=477 bgcolor=#fefefe
| 8477 Andrejkiselev ||  ||  || September 6, 1986 || Nauchnij || L. V. Zhuravleva || — || align=right | 3.4 km || 
|-id=478 bgcolor=#d6d6d6
| 8478 ||  || — || February 23, 1987 || La Silla || H. Debehogne || — || align=right | 24 km || 
|-id=479 bgcolor=#fefefe
| 8479 Held ||  ||  || April 29, 1987 || Kleť || A. Mrkos || — || align=right | 5.0 km || 
|-id=480 bgcolor=#E9E9E9
| 8480 ||  || — || September 13, 1987 || La Silla || H. Debehogne || MIS || align=right | 12 km || 
|-id=481 bgcolor=#d6d6d6
| 8481 || 1988 LH || — || June 14, 1988 || Lake Tekapo || A. C. Gilmore, P. M. Kilmartin || — || align=right | 8.0 km || 
|-id=482 bgcolor=#d6d6d6
| 8482 Wayneolm ||  ||  || September 14, 1988 || Cerro Tololo || S. J. Bus || 7:4 || align=right | 14 km || 
|-id=483 bgcolor=#fefefe
| 8483 Kinwalaniihsia ||  ||  || September 16, 1988 || Cerro Tololo || S. J. Bus || — || align=right | 3.8 km || 
|-id=484 bgcolor=#E9E9E9
| 8484 ||  || — || November 10, 1988 || Yorii || M. Arai, H. Mori || — || align=right | 5.0 km || 
|-id=485 bgcolor=#E9E9E9
| 8485 Satoru || 1989 FL ||  || March 29, 1989 || Geisei || T. Seki || slow || align=right | 5.8 km || 
|-id=486 bgcolor=#d6d6d6
| 8486 Asherschel || 1989 QV ||  || August 26, 1989 || Siding Spring || R. H. McNaught || ALA || align=right | 11 km || 
|-id=487 bgcolor=#fefefe
| 8487 || 1989 SQ || — || September 29, 1989 || Kani || Y. Mizuno, T. Furuta || ERI || align=right | 11 km || 
|-id=488 bgcolor=#fefefe
| 8488 d'Argens ||  ||  || September 26, 1989 || La Silla || E. W. Elst || — || align=right | 3.7 km || 
|-id=489 bgcolor=#d6d6d6
| 8489 Boulder ||  ||  || October 7, 1989 || La Silla || E. W. Elst || HYG || align=right | 11 km || 
|-id=490 bgcolor=#fefefe
| 8490 ||  || — || October 4, 1989 || Kani || Y. Mizuno, T. Furuta || — || align=right | 2.6 km || 
|-id=491 bgcolor=#fefefe
| 8491 Joelle-gilles ||  ||  || December 28, 1989 || Haute-Provence || E. W. Elst || NYS || align=right | 3.5 km || 
|-id=492 bgcolor=#E9E9E9
| 8492 Kikuoka || 1990 BZ ||  || January 21, 1990 || Geisei || T. Seki || MAR || align=right | 4.7 km || 
|-id=493 bgcolor=#fefefe
| 8493 Yachibozu ||  ||  || January 30, 1990 || Kushiro || M. Matsuyama, K. Watanabe || — || align=right | 9.1 km || 
|-id=494 bgcolor=#E9E9E9
| 8494 Edpatvega ||  ||  || July 25, 1990 || Palomar || H. E. Holt || ADE || align=right | 11 km || 
|-id=495 bgcolor=#d6d6d6
| 8495 ||  || — || August 22, 1990 || Palomar || H. E. Holt || KOR || align=right | 5.4 km || 
|-id=496 bgcolor=#d6d6d6
| 8496 Jandlsmith ||  ||  || August 16, 1990 || Harvard Observatory || Oak Ridge Observatory || — || align=right | 13 km || 
|-id=497 bgcolor=#d6d6d6
| 8497 ||  || — || September 13, 1990 || La Silla || H. Debehogne || EOS || align=right | 6.8 km || 
|-id=498 bgcolor=#d6d6d6
| 8498 Ufa ||  ||  || September 15, 1990 || Nauchnij || L. V. Zhuravleva || EOS || align=right | 9.5 km || 
|-id=499 bgcolor=#d6d6d6
| 8499 ||  || — || September 22, 1990 || La Silla || H. Debehogne || KOR || align=right | 8.5 km || 
|-id=500 bgcolor=#d6d6d6
| 8500 Hori || 1990 TU ||  || October 10, 1990 || Kitami || K. Endate, K. Watanabe || — || align=right | 6.6 km || 
|}

8501–8600 

|-bgcolor=#d6d6d6
| 8501 Wachholz ||  ||  || October 13, 1990 || Tautenburg Observatory || L. D. Schmadel, F. Börngen || EOS || align=right | 9.4 km || 
|-id=502 bgcolor=#d6d6d6
| 8502 Bauhaus ||  ||  || October 14, 1990 || Tautenburg Observatory || F. Börngen, L. D. Schmadel || EOS || align=right | 9.6 km || 
|-id=503 bgcolor=#fefefe
| 8503 Masakatsu ||  ||  || November 21, 1990 || Kitami || K. Endate, K. Watanabe || — || align=right | 3.5 km || 
|-id=504 bgcolor=#fefefe
| 8504 || 1990 YC || — || December 17, 1990 || Kushiro || S. Ueda, H. Kaneda || — || align=right | 4.3 km || 
|-id=505 bgcolor=#fefefe
| 8505 || 1990 YK || — || December 19, 1990 || Kushiro || S. Ueda, H. Kaneda || — || align=right | 4.1 km || 
|-id=506 bgcolor=#fefefe
| 8506 || 1991 CN || — || February 5, 1991 || Yorii || M. Arai, H. Mori || FLO || align=right | 4.5 km || 
|-id=507 bgcolor=#FFC2E0
| 8507 ||  || — || February 15, 1991 || Kitt Peak || Spacewatch || APO +1km || align=right | 1.3 km || 
|-id=508 bgcolor=#fefefe
| 8508 ||  || — || February 14, 1991 || Kushiro || S. Ueda, H. Kaneda || — || align=right | 4.8 km || 
|-id=509 bgcolor=#fefefe
| 8509 ||  || — || March 20, 1991 || La Silla || H. Debehogne || — || align=right | 2.7 km || 
|-id=510 bgcolor=#d6d6d6
| 8510 ||  || — || August 5, 1991 || Palomar || H. E. Holt || — || align=right | 7.6 km || 
|-id=511 bgcolor=#E9E9E9
| 8511 ||  || — || August 7, 1991 || Palomar || H. E. Holt || GEF || align=right | 6.9 km || 
|-id=512 bgcolor=#E9E9E9
| 8512 ||  || — || August 7, 1991 || Palomar || H. E. Holt || — || align=right | 15 km || 
|-id=513 bgcolor=#E9E9E9
| 8513 ||  || — || August 9, 1991 || Palomar || H. E. Holt || — || align=right | 13 km || 
|-id=514 bgcolor=#E9E9E9
| 8514 ||  || — || August 7, 1991 || Palomar || H. E. Holt || — || align=right | 5.9 km || 
|-id=515 bgcolor=#E9E9E9
| 8515 Corvan || 1991 RJ ||  || September 4, 1991 || Siding Spring || R. H. McNaught || EUN || align=right | 5.9 km || 
|-id=516 bgcolor=#E9E9E9
| 8516 Hyakkai ||  ||  || October 13, 1991 || Okutama || T. Hioki, S. Hayakawa || MRX || align=right | 5.9 km || 
|-id=517 bgcolor=#d6d6d6
| 8517 ||  || — || January 28, 1992 || Kushiro || S. Ueda, H. Kaneda || — || align=right | 10 km || 
|-id=518 bgcolor=#d6d6d6
| 8518 ||  || — || February 29, 1992 || La Silla || UESAC || THM || align=right | 13 km || 
|-id=519 bgcolor=#d6d6d6
| 8519 ||  || — || February 29, 1992 || La Silla || UESAC || — || align=right | 6.7 km || 
|-id=520 bgcolor=#d6d6d6
| 8520 ||  || — || March 6, 1992 || La Silla || UESAC || — || align=right | 14 km || 
|-id=521 bgcolor=#fefefe
| 8521 Boulainvilliers ||  ||  || April 4, 1992 || La Silla || E. W. Elst || FLO || align=right | 3.6 km || 
|-id=522 bgcolor=#fefefe
| 8522 || 1992 ML || — || June 25, 1992 || Palomar || G. J. Leonard || — || align=right | 4.6 km || 
|-id=523 bgcolor=#fefefe
| 8523 Bouillabaisse || 1992 PX ||  || August 8, 1992 || Caussols || E. W. Elst || — || align=right | 4.0 km || 
|-id=524 bgcolor=#fefefe
| 8524 Paoloruffini ||  ||  || September 2, 1992 || La Silla || E. W. Elst || — || align=right | 3.6 km || 
|-id=525 bgcolor=#fefefe
| 8525 Nielsabel ||  ||  || September 2, 1992 || La Silla || E. W. Elst || NYS || align=right | 4.3 km || 
|-id=526 bgcolor=#fefefe
| 8526 Takeuchiyukou ||  ||  || September 23, 1992 || Kitami || K. Endate, K. Watanabe || V || align=right | 2.6 km || 
|-id=527 bgcolor=#fefefe
| 8527 Katayama ||  ||  || September 28, 1992 || Kitami || K. Endate, K. Watanabe || — || align=right | 4.0 km || 
|-id=528 bgcolor=#fefefe
| 8528 ||  || — || September 29, 1992 || Palomar || H. E. Holt || V || align=right | 4.0 km || 
|-id=529 bgcolor=#fefefe
| 8529 Sinzi ||  ||  || October 19, 1992 || Kitami || K. Endate, K. Watanabe || V || align=right | 3.2 km || 
|-id=530 bgcolor=#fefefe
| 8530 Korbokkur ||  ||  || October 25, 1992 || Nyukasa || M. Hirasawa, S. Suzuki || — || align=right | 5.0 km || 
|-id=531 bgcolor=#E9E9E9
| 8531 Mineosaito ||  ||  || November 16, 1992 || Kitami || K. Endate, K. Watanabe || — || align=right | 11 km || 
|-id=532 bgcolor=#E9E9E9
| 8532 ||  || — || December 29, 1992 || Yatsugatake || Y. Kushida, O. Muramatsu || — || align=right | 8.8 km || 
|-id=533 bgcolor=#E9E9E9
| 8533 Oohira || 1993 BM ||  || January 20, 1993 || Oohira || T. Urata || GEF || align=right | 6.7 km || 
|-id=534 bgcolor=#d6d6d6
| 8534 Knutsson ||  ||  || March 17, 1993 || La Silla || C.-I. Lagerkvist || KOR || align=right | 7.3 km || 
|-id=535 bgcolor=#d6d6d6
| 8535 Pellesvanslös ||  ||  || March 21, 1993 || La Silla || C.-I. Lagerkvist || THM || align=right | 12 km || 
|-id=536 bgcolor=#d6d6d6
| 8536 Måns ||  ||  || March 21, 1993 || La Silla || C.-I. Lagerkvist || — || align=right | 5.8 km || 
|-id=537 bgcolor=#d6d6d6
| 8537 Billochbull ||  ||  || March 21, 1993 || La Silla || C.-I. Lagerkvist || — || align=right | 12 km || 
|-id=538 bgcolor=#d6d6d6
| 8538 Gammelmaja ||  ||  || March 21, 1993 || La Silla || C.-I. Lagerkvist || EOS || align=right | 12 km || 
|-id=539 bgcolor=#d6d6d6
| 8539 Laban ||  ||  || March 19, 1993 || La Silla || C.-I. Lagerkvist || KOR || align=right | 6.6 km || 
|-id=540 bgcolor=#d6d6d6
| 8540 Ardeberg ||  ||  || March 17, 1993 || La Silla || UESAC || — || align=right | 9.5 km || 
|-id=541 bgcolor=#fefefe
| 8541 Schalkenmehren ||  ||  || October 9, 1993 || La Silla || E. W. Elst || — || align=right | 3.0 km || 
|-id=542 bgcolor=#fefefe
| 8542 ||  || — || November 11, 1993 || Kushiro || S. Ueda, H. Kaneda || — || align=right | 4.1 km || 
|-id=543 bgcolor=#fefefe
| 8543 Tsunemi ||  ||  || December 15, 1993 || Oizumi || T. Kobayashi || FLO || align=right | 3.5 km || 
|-id=544 bgcolor=#fefefe
| 8544 Sigenori || 1993 YE ||  || December 17, 1993 || Oizumi || T. Kobayashi || — || align=right | 2.7 km || 
|-id=545 bgcolor=#fefefe
| 8545 McGee ||  ||  || January 2, 1994 || Stakenbridge || B. G. W. Manning || V || align=right | 2.3 km || 
|-id=546 bgcolor=#fefefe
| 8546 Kenmotsu ||  ||  || January 13, 1994 || Kitami || K. Endate, K. Watanabe || — || align=right | 5.1 km || 
|-id=547 bgcolor=#fefefe
| 8547 || 1994 CQ || — || February 4, 1994 || Kushiro || S. Ueda, H. Kaneda || NYS || align=right | 2.5 km || 
|-id=548 bgcolor=#E9E9E9
| 8548 Sumizihara ||  ||  || March 14, 1994 || Kitami || K. Endate, K. Watanabe || — || align=right | 5.3 km || 
|-id=549 bgcolor=#fefefe
| 8549 Alcide || 1994 FS ||  || March 30, 1994 || Farra d'Isonzo || Farra d'Isonzo || NYS || align=right | 4.3 km || 
|-id=550 bgcolor=#d6d6d6
| 8550 Hesiodos ||  ||  || August 12, 1994 || La Silla || E. W. Elst || SHU3:2 || align=right | 25 km || 
|-id=551 bgcolor=#d6d6d6
| 8551 Daitarabochi ||  ||  || November 11, 1994 || Nyukasa || M. Hirasawa, S. Suzuki || 3:2 || align=right | 31 km || 
|-id=552 bgcolor=#E9E9E9
| 8552 Hyoichi || 1995 HE ||  || April 20, 1995 || Kuma Kogen || A. Nakamura || HNA || align=right | 8.9 km || 
|-id=553 bgcolor=#fefefe
| 8553 Bradsmith || 1995 HG ||  || April 20, 1995 || Kitami || K. Endate, K. Watanabe || — || align=right | 4.9 km || 
|-id=554 bgcolor=#fefefe
| 8554 Gabreta || 1995 KH ||  || May 25, 1995 || Kleť || M. Tichý || — || align=right | 2.6 km || 
|-id=555 bgcolor=#fefefe
| 8555 Mirimao || 1995 LD ||  || June 3, 1995 || Stroncone || Santa Lucia Obs. || V || align=right | 2.4 km || 
|-id=556 bgcolor=#d6d6d6
| 8556 Jana || 1995 NB ||  || July 7, 1995 || Kleť || Z. Moravec || — || align=right | 7.3 km || 
|-id=557 bgcolor=#fefefe
| 8557 Šaroun || 1995 OK ||  || July 23, 1995 || Ondřejov || L. Kotková || V || align=right | 2.2 km || 
|-id=558 bgcolor=#d6d6d6
| 8558 Hack || 1995 PC ||  || August 1, 1995 || San Marcello || L. Tesi, A. Boattini || — || align=right | 7.7 km || 
|-id=559 bgcolor=#E9E9E9
| 8559 ||  || — || August 25, 1995 || Nachi-Katsuura || Y. Shimizu, T. Urata || — || align=right | 12 km || 
|-id=560 bgcolor=#d6d6d6
| 8560 Tsubaki ||  ||  || September 20, 1995 || Kitami || K. Endate, K. Watanabe || — || align=right | 19 km || 
|-id=561 bgcolor=#d6d6d6
| 8561 Sikoruk ||  ||  || September 26, 1995 || Zelenchukskaya || T. V. Kryachko || THM || align=right | 12 km || 
|-id=562 bgcolor=#d6d6d6
| 8562 ||  || — || September 28, 1995 || Xinglong || SCAP || — || align=right | 7.0 km || 
|-id=563 bgcolor=#d6d6d6
| 8563 || 1995 US || — || October 19, 1995 || Catalina Station || T. B. Spahr || — || align=right | 14 km || 
|-id=564 bgcolor=#d6d6d6
| 8564 Anomalocaris ||  ||  || October 17, 1995 || Nachi-Katsuura || Y. Shimizu, T. Urata || — || align=right | 17 km || 
|-id=565 bgcolor=#E9E9E9
| 8565 ||  || — || November 24, 1995 || Ojima || T. Niijima, T. Urata || GEF || align=right | 16 km || 
|-id=566 bgcolor=#FFC2E0
| 8566 || 1996 EN || — || March 15, 1996 || Haleakalā || NEAT || APO +1kmPHA || align=right | 1.6 km || 
|-id=567 bgcolor=#FFC2E0
| 8567 ||  || — || April 23, 1996 || Kitt Peak || Spacewatch || AMO +1km || align=right | 2.9 km || 
|-id=568 bgcolor=#fefefe
| 8568 Larrywilson ||  ||  || September 10, 1996 || Haleakalā || NEAT || — || align=right | 3.1 km || 
|-id=569 bgcolor=#fefefe
| 8569 Mameli || 1996 TG ||  || October 1, 1996 || Colleverde || V. S. Casulli || — || align=right | 3.5 km || 
|-id=570 bgcolor=#d6d6d6
| 8570 ||  || — || October 9, 1996 || Kushiro || S. Ueda, H. Kaneda || EOS || align=right | 11 km || 
|-id=571 bgcolor=#d6d6d6
| 8571 Taniguchi || 1996 UX ||  || October 20, 1996 || Oizumi || T. Kobayashi || KOR || align=right | 6.2 km || 
|-id=572 bgcolor=#fefefe
| 8572 Nijo ||  ||  || October 19, 1996 || Kleť || J. Tichá, M. Tichý || FLO || align=right | 3.0 km || 
|-id=573 bgcolor=#d6d6d6
| 8573 Ivanka || 1996 VQ ||  || November 4, 1996 || Kleť || Z. Moravec || JLI || align=right | 11 km || 
|-id=574 bgcolor=#fefefe
| 8574 Makotoirie ||  ||  || November 6, 1996 || Oizumi || T. Kobayashi || — || align=right | 2.5 km || 
|-id=575 bgcolor=#fefefe
| 8575 Seishitakeuchi ||  ||  || November 7, 1996 || Kitami || K. Endate, K. Watanabe || FLO || align=right | 2.7 km || 
|-id=576 bgcolor=#fefefe
| 8576 ||  || — || November 7, 1996 || Kushiro || S. Ueda, H. Kaneda || NYS || align=right | 2.9 km || 
|-id=577 bgcolor=#fefefe
| 8577 Choseikomori ||  ||  || November 7, 1996 || Kitami || K. Endate, K. Watanabe || — || align=right | 4.6 km || 
|-id=578 bgcolor=#d6d6d6
| 8578 Shojikato || 1996 WZ ||  || November 19, 1996 || Oizumi || T. Kobayashi || EOS || align=right | 12 km || 
|-id=579 bgcolor=#fefefe
| 8579 Hieizan ||  ||  || December 11, 1996 || Oizumi || T. Kobayashi || — || align=right | 11 km || 
|-id=580 bgcolor=#d6d6d6
| 8580 Pinsky ||  ||  || December 14, 1996 || Prescott || P. G. Comba || — || align=right | 14 km || 
|-id=581 bgcolor=#d6d6d6
| 8581 Johnen ||  ||  || December 28, 1996 || Chichibu || N. Satō || KOR || align=right | 5.8 km || 
|-id=582 bgcolor=#d6d6d6
| 8582 Kazuhisa || 1997 AY ||  || January 2, 1997 || Oizumi || T. Kobayashi || — || align=right | 15 km || 
|-id=583 bgcolor=#d6d6d6
| 8583 Froberger ||  ||  || January 8, 1997 || Prescott || P. G. Comba || — || align=right | 6.6 km || 
|-id=584 bgcolor=#d6d6d6
| 8584 ||  || — || January 11, 1997 || Xinglong || SCAP || EOS || align=right | 12 km || 
|-id=585 bgcolor=#d6d6d6
| 8585 Purpurea || 2025 P-L ||  || September 24, 1960 || Palomar || PLS || — || align=right | 17 km || 
|-id=586 bgcolor=#d6d6d6
| 8586 Epops || 2563 P-L ||  || September 24, 1960 || Palomar || PLS || THM || align=right | 15 km || 
|-id=587 bgcolor=#fefefe
| 8587 Ruficollis || 3078 P-L ||  || September 25, 1960 || Palomar || PLS || — || align=right | 3.1 km || 
|-id=588 bgcolor=#fefefe
| 8588 Avosetta || 4025 P-L ||  || September 24, 1960 || Palomar || PLS || — || align=right | 3.4 km || 
|-id=589 bgcolor=#fefefe
| 8589 Stellaris || 4068 P-L ||  || September 24, 1960 || Palomar || PLS || — || align=right | 3.3 km || 
|-id=590 bgcolor=#d6d6d6
| 8590 Pygargus || 6533 P-L ||  || September 24, 1960 || Palomar || PLS || THM || align=right | 11 km || 
|-id=591 bgcolor=#d6d6d6
| 8591 Excubitor || 6543 P-L ||  || September 24, 1960 || Palomar || PLS || THM || align=right | 15 km || 
|-id=592 bgcolor=#fefefe
| 8592 Rubetra || 1188 T-1 ||  || March 25, 1971 || Palomar || PLS || FLO || align=right | 4.5 km || 
|-id=593 bgcolor=#d6d6d6
| 8593 Angustirostris || 2186 T-1 ||  || March 25, 1971 || Palomar || PLS || — || align=right | 18 km || 
|-id=594 bgcolor=#fefefe
| 8594 Albifrons || 2245 T-1 ||  || March 25, 1971 || Palomar || PLS || NYS || align=right | 3.0 km || 
|-id=595 bgcolor=#E9E9E9
| 8595 Dougallii || 3233 T-1 ||  || March 26, 1971 || Palomar || PLS || — || align=right | 9.8 km || 
|-id=596 bgcolor=#fefefe
| 8596 Alchata || 1298 T-2 ||  || September 29, 1973 || Palomar || PLS || FLO || align=right | 3.0 km || 
|-id=597 bgcolor=#E9E9E9
| 8597 Sandvicensis || 2045 T-2 ||  || September 29, 1973 || Palomar || PLS || EUN || align=right | 5.3 km || 
|-id=598 bgcolor=#d6d6d6
| 8598 Tetrix || 2202 T-2 ||  || September 29, 1973 || Palomar || PLS || THM || align=right | 9.7 km || 
|-id=599 bgcolor=#E9E9E9
| 8599 Riparia || 2277 T-2 ||  || September 29, 1973 || Palomar || PLS || HEN || align=right | 5.4 km || 
|-id=600 bgcolor=#fefefe
| 8600 Arundinaceus || 3060 T-2 ||  || September 30, 1973 || Palomar || PLS || NYS || align=right | 4.4 km || 
|}

8601–8700 

|-bgcolor=#d6d6d6
| 8601 Ciconia || 3155 T-2 ||  || September 30, 1973 || Palomar || PLS || HYG || align=right | 9.1 km || 
|-id=602 bgcolor=#fefefe
| 8602 Oedicnemus || 2480 T-3 ||  || October 16, 1977 || Palomar || PLS || — || align=right | 5.7 km || 
|-id=603 bgcolor=#fefefe
| 8603 Senator || 3134 T-3 ||  || October 16, 1977 || Palomar || PLS || — || align=right | 3.0 km || 
|-id=604 bgcolor=#fefefe
| 8604 Vanier || 1929 PK ||  || August 12, 1929 || Mount Hamilton || C. J. Krieger || — || align=right | 4.1 km || 
|-id=605 bgcolor=#E9E9E9
| 8605 || 1968 OH || — || July 18, 1968 || Cerro El Roble || C. Torres, S. Cofré || — || align=right | 5.6 km || 
|-id=606 bgcolor=#d6d6d6
| 8606 || 1971 UG || — || October 26, 1971 || Hamburg-Bergedorf || L. Kohoutek || — || align=right | 9.8 km || 
|-id=607 bgcolor=#fefefe
| 8607 || 1971 UT || — || October 26, 1971 || Hamburg-Bergedorf || L. Kohoutek || — || align=right | 3.7 km || 
|-id=608 bgcolor=#fefefe
| 8608 Chelomey ||  ||  || December 16, 1976 || Nauchnij || L. I. Chernykh || — || align=right | 5.3 km || 
|-id=609 bgcolor=#fefefe
| 8609 Shuvalov ||  ||  || August 22, 1977 || Nauchnij || N. S. Chernykh || — || align=right | 8.9 km || 
|-id=610 bgcolor=#fefefe
| 8610 Goldhaber || 1977 UD ||  || October 22, 1977 || Harvard Observatory || Harvard Obs. || NYS || align=right | 4.3 km || 
|-id=611 bgcolor=#fefefe
| 8611 Judithgoldhaber ||  ||  || October 18, 1977 || Palomar || S. J. Bus || NYS || align=right | 4.7 km || 
|-id=612 bgcolor=#fefefe
| 8612 Burov ||  ||  || September 26, 1978 || Nauchnij || L. V. Zhuravleva || ERI || align=right | 5.2 km || 
|-id=613 bgcolor=#d6d6d6
| 8613 Cindyschulz ||  ||  || November 7, 1978 || Palomar || E. F. Helin, S. J. Bus || — || align=right | 8.3 km || 
|-id=614 bgcolor=#d6d6d6
| 8614 ||  || — || November 7, 1978 || Palomar || E. F. Helin, S. J. Bus || THM || align=right | 13 km || 
|-id=615 bgcolor=#E9E9E9
| 8615 Philipgrahamgood ||  ||  || June 25, 1979 || Siding Spring || E. F. Helin, S. J. Bus || slow || align=right | 5.7 km || 
|-id=616 bgcolor=#fefefe
| 8616 Fogelquist ||  ||  || March 16, 1980 || La Silla || C.-I. Lagerkvist || — || align=right | 3.5 km || 
|-id=617 bgcolor=#fefefe
| 8617 Fellous || 1980 PW ||  || August 6, 1980 || Kleť || Z. Vávrová || — || align=right | 5.1 km || 
|-id=618 bgcolor=#d6d6d6
| 8618 Sethjacobson || 1981 DX ||  || February 28, 1981 || Siding Spring || S. J. Bus || — || align=right | 7.9 km || 
|-id=619 bgcolor=#d6d6d6
| 8619 ||  || — || March 6, 1981 || La Silla || H. Debehogne, G. DeSanctis || — || align=right | 13 km || 
|-id=620 bgcolor=#d6d6d6
| 8620 Lowkevrudolph ||  ||  || March 2, 1981 || Siding Spring || S. J. Bus || — || align=right | 10 km || 
|-id=621 bgcolor=#d6d6d6
| 8621 Jimparsons ||  ||  || March 1, 1981 || Siding Spring || S. J. Bus || HYG || align=right | 9.2 km || 
|-id=622 bgcolor=#d6d6d6
| 8622 Mayimbialik ||  ||  || March 1, 1981 || Siding Spring || S. J. Bus || HYG || align=right | 9.4 km || 
|-id=623 bgcolor=#d6d6d6
| 8623 Johnnygalecki ||  ||  || March 1, 1981 || Siding Spring || S. J. Bus || HYG || align=right | 8.2 km || 
|-id=624 bgcolor=#d6d6d6
| 8624 Kaleycuoco ||  ||  || March 1, 1981 || Siding Spring || S. J. Bus || VER || align=right | 9.5 km || 
|-id=625 bgcolor=#E9E9E9
| 8625 Simonhelberg ||  ||  || March 1, 1981 || Siding Spring || S. J. Bus || — || align=right | 3.7 km || 
|-id=626 bgcolor=#d6d6d6
| 8626 Melissarauch ||  ||  || March 2, 1981 || Siding Spring || S. J. Bus || — || align=right | 4.3 km || 
|-id=627 bgcolor=#E9E9E9
| 8627 Kunalnayyar ||  ||  || March 2, 1981 || Siding Spring || S. J. Bus || — || align=right | 3.6 km || 
|-id=628 bgcolor=#E9E9E9
| 8628 Davidsaltzberg ||  ||  || March 2, 1981 || Siding Spring || S. J. Bus || ADE || align=right | 10 km || 
|-id=629 bgcolor=#d6d6d6
| 8629 Chucklorre ||  ||  || March 2, 1981 || Siding Spring || S. J. Bus || HYG || align=right | 8.0 km || 
|-id=630 bgcolor=#fefefe
| 8630 Billprady ||  ||  || March 2, 1981 || Siding Spring || S. J. Bus || — || align=right | 3.6 km || 
|-id=631 bgcolor=#fefefe
| 8631 Sherikboonstra ||  ||  || March 2, 1981 || Siding Spring || S. J. Bus || — || align=right | 3.5 km || 
|-id=632 bgcolor=#E9E9E9
| 8632 Egleston || 1981 FR ||  || March 28, 1981 || Harvard Observatory || Harvard Obs. || — || align=right | 3.8 km || 
|-id=633 bgcolor=#d6d6d6
| 8633 Keisukenagao ||  ||  || March 16, 1981 || Siding Spring || S. J. Bus || — || align=right | 7.6 km || 
|-id=634 bgcolor=#E9E9E9
| 8634 Neubauer || 1981 GG ||  || April 5, 1981 || Anderson Mesa || E. Bowell || — || align=right | 5.4 km || 
|-id=635 bgcolor=#fefefe
| 8635 Yuriosipov ||  ||  || August 13, 1985 || Nauchnij || N. S. Chernykh || NYS || align=right | 8.6 km || 
|-id=636 bgcolor=#fefefe
| 8636 Malvina ||  ||  || October 17, 1985 || Caussols || CERGA || — || align=right | 4.9 km || 
|-id=637 bgcolor=#fefefe
| 8637 ||  || — || February 6, 1986 || La Silla || H. Debehogne || NYS || align=right | 6.7 km || 
|-id=638 bgcolor=#E9E9E9
| 8638 || 1986 QY || — || August 26, 1986 || La Silla || H. Debehogne || MRX || align=right | 6.3 km || 
|-id=639 bgcolor=#fefefe
| 8639 Vonšovský ||  ||  || November 3, 1986 || Kleť || A. Mrkos || FLO || align=right | 2.8 km || 
|-id=640 bgcolor=#E9E9E9
| 8640 Ritaschulz ||  ||  || November 6, 1986 || Anderson Mesa || E. Bowell || — || align=right | 6.4 km || 
|-id=641 bgcolor=#d6d6d6
| 8641 ||  || — || January 27, 1987 || Brorfelde || P. Jensen || — || align=right | 14 km || 
|-id=642 bgcolor=#d6d6d6
| 8642 Shawnkerry ||  ||  || September 14, 1988 || Cerro Tololo || S. J. Bus || — || align=right | 13 km || 
|-id=643 bgcolor=#E9E9E9
| 8643 Quercus || 1988 SC ||  || September 16, 1988 || Haute-Provence || E. W. Elst || EUN || align=right | 5.8 km || 
|-id=644 bgcolor=#fefefe
| 8644 Betulapendula || 1988 SD ||  || September 16, 1988 || Haute Provence || E. W. Elst || — || align=right | 4.4 km || 
|-id=645 bgcolor=#fefefe
| 8645 || 1988 TN || — || October 5, 1988 || Kushiro || S. Ueda, H. Kaneda || — || align=right | 5.1 km || 
|-id=646 bgcolor=#fefefe
| 8646 ||  || — || October 13, 1988 || Kushiro || S. Ueda, H. Kaneda || — || align=right | 3.1 km || 
|-id=647 bgcolor=#fefefe
| 8647 Populus || 1989 RG ||  || September 2, 1989 || Haute-Provence || E. W. Elst || — || align=right | 3.9 km || 
|-id=648 bgcolor=#fefefe
| 8648 Salix || 1989 RJ ||  || September 2, 1989 || Haute Provence || E. W. Elst || — || align=right | 4.2 km || 
|-id=649 bgcolor=#fefefe
| 8649 Juglans ||  ||  || September 26, 1989 || La Silla || E. W. Elst || — || align=right | 2.8 km || 
|-id=650 bgcolor=#fefefe
| 8650 ||  || — || October 5, 1989 || Kleť || A. Mrkos || FLO || align=right | 4.6 km || 
|-id=651 bgcolor=#FA8072
| 8651 Alineraynal ||  ||  || December 29, 1989 || Haute-Provence || E. W. Elst || — || align=right | 3.8 km || 
|-id=652 bgcolor=#fefefe
| 8652 Acacia ||  ||  || March 2, 1990 || La Silla || E. W. Elst || NYS || align=right | 4.1 km || 
|-id=653 bgcolor=#E9E9E9
| 8653 || 1990 KE || — || May 20, 1990 || Siding Spring || R. H. McNaught || MAR || align=right | 6.9 km || 
|-id=654 bgcolor=#E9E9E9
| 8654 ||  || — || May 20, 1990 || Siding Spring || R. H. McNaught || EUN || align=right | 6.3 km || 
|-id=655 bgcolor=#fefefe
| 8655 ||  || — || August 22, 1990 || Palomar || H. E. Holt || FLO || align=right | 3.3 km || 
|-id=656 bgcolor=#d6d6d6
| 8656 Cupressus ||  ||  || August 16, 1990 || La Silla || E. W. Elst || — || align=right | 8.8 km || 
|-id=657 bgcolor=#d6d6d6
| 8657 Cedrus ||  ||  || August 16, 1990 || La Silla || E. W. Elst || KOR || align=right | 5.9 km || 
|-id=658 bgcolor=#d6d6d6
| 8658 ||  || — || September 14, 1990 || Palomar || H. E. Holt || — || align=right | 5.5 km || 
|-id=659 bgcolor=#E9E9E9
| 8659 ||  || — || September 17, 1990 || Palomar || H. E. Holt || GEF || align=right | 7.1 km || 
|-id=660 bgcolor=#d6d6d6
| 8660 Sano ||  ||  || October 15, 1990 || Kitami || K. Endate, K. Watanabe || — || align=right | 14 km || 
|-id=661 bgcolor=#d6d6d6
| 8661 Ratzinger ||  ||  || October 14, 1990 || Tautenburg Observatory || L. D. Schmadel, F. Börngen || EOS || align=right | 13 km || 
|-id=662 bgcolor=#d6d6d6
| 8662 ||  || — || October 22, 1990 || Kushiro || S. Ueda, H. Kaneda || — || align=right | 11 km || 
|-id=663 bgcolor=#fefefe
| 8663 Davidjohnston ||  ||  || February 18, 1991 || Palomar || E. F. Helin || FLO || align=right | 4.6 km || 
|-id=664 bgcolor=#fefefe
| 8664 Grigorijrichters ||  ||  || April 10, 1991 || Palomar || E. F. Helin || V || align=right | 4.2 km || 
|-id=665 bgcolor=#fefefe
| 8665 Daun-Eifel ||  ||  || April 8, 1991 || La Silla || E. W. Elst || V || align=right | 2.6 km || 
|-id=666 bgcolor=#fefefe
| 8666 Reuter ||  ||  || April 9, 1991 || Tautenburg Observatory || F. Börngen || — || align=right | 3.8 km || 
|-id=667 bgcolor=#fefefe
| 8667 Fontane ||  ||  || April 9, 1991 || Tautenburg Observatory || F. Börngen || V || align=right | 4.2 km || 
|-id=668 bgcolor=#fefefe
| 8668 Satomimura || 1991 HM ||  || April 16, 1991 || Kiyosato || S. Otomo, O. Muramatsu || — || align=right | 6.0 km || 
|-id=669 bgcolor=#fefefe
| 8669 ||  || — || July 13, 1991 || Palomar || H. E. Holt || — || align=right | 3.9 km || 
|-id=670 bgcolor=#fefefe
| 8670 ||  || — || July 18, 1991 || La Silla || H. Debehogne || NYS || align=right | 4.6 km || 
|-id=671 bgcolor=#fefefe
| 8671 || 1991 PW || — || August 5, 1991 || Palomar || H. E. Holt || — || align=right | 6.2 km || 
|-id=672 bgcolor=#fefefe
| 8672 Morse ||  ||  || August 6, 1991 || La Silla || E. W. Elst || NYS || align=right | 2.7 km || 
|-id=673 bgcolor=#E9E9E9
| 8673 ||  || — || September 13, 1991 || Palomar || H. E. Holt || — || align=right | 11 km || 
|-id=674 bgcolor=#d6d6d6
| 8674 ||  || — || November 4, 1991 || Kushiro || S. Ueda, H. Kaneda || — || align=right | 8.6 km || 
|-id=675 bgcolor=#d6d6d6
| 8675 || 1991 YZ || — || December 30, 1991 || Kushiro || S. Ueda, H. Kaneda || — || align=right | 10 km || 
|-id=676 bgcolor=#d6d6d6
| 8676 Lully ||  ||  || February 2, 1992 || La Silla || E. W. Elst || — || align=right | 12 km || 
|-id=677 bgcolor=#d6d6d6
| 8677 Charlier ||  ||  || March 2, 1992 || La Silla || UESAC || EOS || align=right | 8.6 km || 
|-id=678 bgcolor=#d6d6d6
| 8678 Bäl ||  ||  || March 1, 1992 || La Silla || UESAC || HYG || align=right | 9.9 km || 
|-id=679 bgcolor=#d6d6d6
| 8679 Tingstäde ||  ||  || March 2, 1992 || La Silla || UESAC || THM || align=right | 9.2 km || 
|-id=680 bgcolor=#d6d6d6
| 8680 Rone ||  ||  || March 2, 1992 || La Silla || UESAC || HYG || align=right | 10 km || 
|-id=681 bgcolor=#d6d6d6
| 8681 Burs ||  ||  || March 2, 1992 || La Silla || UESAC || THM || align=right | 13 km || 
|-id=682 bgcolor=#d6d6d6
| 8682 Kräklingbo ||  ||  || March 2, 1992 || La Silla || UESAC || THM || align=right | 14 km || 
|-id=683 bgcolor=#d6d6d6
| 8683 Sjölander ||  ||  || March 2, 1992 || La Silla || UESAC || — || align=right | 8.7 km || 
|-id=684 bgcolor=#fefefe
| 8684 Reichwein ||  ||  || March 30, 1992 || Tautenburg Observatory || F. Börngen || — || align=right | 3.2 km || 
|-id=685 bgcolor=#fefefe
| 8685 Fauré ||  ||  || April 4, 1992 || La Silla || E. W. Elst || — || align=right | 3.4 km || 
|-id=686 bgcolor=#fefefe
| 8686 Akenside ||  ||  || July 26, 1992 || La Silla || E. W. Elst || V || align=right | 2.9 km || 
|-id=687 bgcolor=#fefefe
| 8687 Caussols || 1992 PV ||  || August 8, 1992 || Caussols || E. W. Elst || — || align=right | 3.0 km || 
|-id=688 bgcolor=#fefefe
| 8688 Delaunay ||  ||  || August 8, 1992 || Caussols || E. W. Elst || FLO || align=right | 3.3 km || 
|-id=689 bgcolor=#fefefe
| 8689 ||  || — || August 5, 1992 || Palomar || H. E. Holt || — || align=right | 3.0 km || 
|-id=690 bgcolor=#fefefe
| 8690 Swindle ||  ||  || September 24, 1992 || Kitt Peak || Spacewatch || MAS || align=right | 2.4 km || 
|-id=691 bgcolor=#fefefe
| 8691 Etsuko ||  ||  || October 21, 1992 || Yatsugatake || Y. Kushida, O. Muramatsu || V || align=right | 4.6 km || 
|-id=692 bgcolor=#fefefe
| 8692 || 1992 WH || — || November 16, 1992 || Kushiro || S. Ueda, H. Kaneda || V || align=right | 3.8 km || 
|-id=693 bgcolor=#fefefe
| 8693 Matsuki ||  ||  || November 16, 1992 || Kitami || K. Endate, K. Watanabe || V || align=right | 5.9 km || 
|-id=694 bgcolor=#d6d6d6
| 8694 || 1993 CO || — || February 10, 1993 || Kushiro || S. Ueda, H. Kaneda || KOR || align=right | 8.3 km || 
|-id=695 bgcolor=#d6d6d6
| 8695 Bergvall ||  ||  || March 17, 1993 || La Silla || UESAC || — || align=right | 4.0 km || 
|-id=696 bgcolor=#d6d6d6
| 8696 Kjeriksson ||  ||  || March 17, 1993 || La Silla || UESAC || HYG || align=right | 9.2 km || 
|-id=697 bgcolor=#d6d6d6
| 8697 Olofsson ||  ||  || March 21, 1993 || La Silla || UESAC || THM || align=right | 9.2 km || 
|-id=698 bgcolor=#d6d6d6
| 8698 Bertilpettersson ||  ||  || March 19, 1993 || La Silla || UESAC || KOR || align=right | 8.2 km || 
|-id=699 bgcolor=#d6d6d6
| 8699 ||  || — || March 19, 1993 || La Silla || UESAC || — || align=right | 7.2 km || 
|-id=700 bgcolor=#d6d6d6
| 8700 Gevaert ||  ||  || May 14, 1993 || La Silla || E. W. Elst || THM || align=right | 15 km || 
|}

8701–8800 

|-bgcolor=#d6d6d6
| 8701 ||  || — || June 15, 1993 || Palomar || H. E. Holt || — || align=right | 17 km || 
|-id=702 bgcolor=#fefefe
| 8702 Nakanishi ||  ||  || November 14, 1993 || Nyukasa || M. Hirasawa, S. Suzuki || FLO || align=right | 3.6 km || 
|-id=703 bgcolor=#fefefe
| 8703 Nakanotadao ||  ||  || December 15, 1993 || Oizumi || T. Kobayashi || — || align=right | 4.5 km || 
|-id=704 bgcolor=#fefefe
| 8704 Sadakane || 1993 YJ ||  || December 17, 1993 || Oizumi || T. Kobayashi || — || align=right | 1.9 km || 
|-id=705 bgcolor=#fefefe
| 8705 ||  || — || January 8, 1994 || Fujieda || H. Shiozawa, T. Urata || V || align=right | 3.1 km || 
|-id=706 bgcolor=#d6d6d6
| 8706 Takeyama || 1994 CM ||  || February 3, 1994 || Oizumi || T. Kobayashi || — || align=right | 9.6 km || 
|-id=707 bgcolor=#fefefe
| 8707 Arakihiroshi ||  ||  || February 12, 1994 || Oizumi || T. Kobayashi || — || align=right | 4.6 km || 
|-id=708 bgcolor=#E9E9E9
| 8708 || 1994 DD || — || February 17, 1994 || Kiyosato || S. Otomo || MIS || align=right | 11 km || 
|-id=709 bgcolor=#FFC2E0
| 8709 Kadlu ||  ||  || May 14, 1994 || Palomar || C. S. Shoemaker, E. M. Shoemaker || AMO +1km || align=right | 1.5 km || 
|-id=710 bgcolor=#E9E9E9
| 8710 Hawley ||  ||  || May 15, 1994 || Palomar || C. P. de Saint-Aignan || — || align=right | 11 km || 
|-id=711 bgcolor=#E9E9E9
| 8711 Lukeasher || 1994 LL ||  || June 5, 1994 || Catalina Station || C. W. Hergenrother || — || align=right | 14 km || 
|-id=712 bgcolor=#d6d6d6
| 8712 Suzuko ||  ||  || October 2, 1994 || Kitami || K. Endate, K. Watanabe || THM || align=right | 16 km || 
|-id=713 bgcolor=#fefefe
| 8713 Azusa ||  ||  || January 26, 1995 || Kitami || K. Endate, K. Watanabe || NYS || align=right | 4.0 km || 
|-id=714 bgcolor=#fefefe
| 8714 || 1995 OT || — || July 24, 1995 || Nachi-Katsuura || Y. Shimizu, T. Urata || — || align=right | 4.3 km || 
|-id=715 bgcolor=#fefefe
| 8715 ||  || — || July 26, 1995 || Nachi-Katsuura || Y. Shimizu, T. Urata || — || align=right | 3.6 km || 
|-id=716 bgcolor=#d6d6d6
| 8716 Ginestra ||  ||  || September 23, 1995 || Colleverde || V. S. Casulli || — || align=right | 9.8 km || 
|-id=717 bgcolor=#d6d6d6
| 8717 Richviktorov ||  ||  || September 26, 1995 || Zelenchukskaya || T. V. Kryachko || THM || align=right | 12 km || 
|-id=718 bgcolor=#d6d6d6
| 8718 ||  || — || October 27, 1995 || Nachi-Katsuura || Y. Shimizu, T. Urata || — || align=right | 7.2 km || 
|-id=719 bgcolor=#E9E9E9
| 8719 Vesmír || 1995 VR ||  || November 11, 1995 || Kleť || Kleť Obs. || EUN || align=right | 6.1 km || 
|-id=720 bgcolor=#d6d6d6
| 8720 Takamizawa ||  ||  || November 16, 1995 || Kuma Kogen || A. Nakamura || — || align=right | 11 km || 
|-id=721 bgcolor=#d6d6d6
| 8721 AMOS ||  ||  || January 14, 1996 || Haleakalā || AMOS || 3:2 || align=right | 50 km || 
|-id=722 bgcolor=#fefefe
| 8722 Schirra ||  ||  || August 19, 1996 || Granville || R. G. Davis || — || align=right | 4.8 km || 
|-id=723 bgcolor=#fefefe
| 8723 Azumayama ||  ||  || September 23, 1996 || Nanyo || T. Okuni || FLO || align=right | 2.7 km || 
|-id=724 bgcolor=#fefefe
| 8724 Junkoehara ||  ||  || September 17, 1996 || Kiyosato || S. Otomo || NYS || align=right | 3.1 km || 
|-id=725 bgcolor=#fefefe
| 8725 Keiko ||  ||  || October 5, 1996 || Yatsuka || H. Abe || — || align=right | 3.7 km || 
|-id=726 bgcolor=#d6d6d6
| 8726 Masamotonasu ||  ||  || November 14, 1996 || Oizumi || T. Kobayashi || VER || align=right | 15 km || 
|-id=727 bgcolor=#fefefe
| 8727 ||  || — || November 3, 1996 || Kushiro || S. Ueda, H. Kaneda || — || align=right | 3.7 km || 
|-id=728 bgcolor=#fefefe
| 8728 Mimatsu ||  ||  || November 7, 1996 || Kitami || K. Endate, K. Watanabe || NYS || align=right | 2.8 km || 
|-id=729 bgcolor=#fefefe
| 8729 Descour ||  ||  || November 5, 1996 || Kitt Peak || Spacewatch || — || align=right | 3.3 km || 
|-id=730 bgcolor=#fefefe
| 8730 Iidesan ||  ||  || November 10, 1996 || Nanyo || T. Okuni || NYS || align=right | 3.4 km || 
|-id=731 bgcolor=#fefefe
| 8731 Tejima || 1996 WY ||  || November 19, 1996 || Oizumi || T. Kobayashi || V || align=right | 2.3 km || 
|-id=732 bgcolor=#fefefe
| 8732 Champion ||  ||  || December 8, 1996 || Geisei || T. Seki || — || align=right | 4.7 km || 
|-id=733 bgcolor=#E9E9E9
| 8733 Ohsugi ||  ||  || December 20, 1996 || Oizumi || T. Kobayashi || AGN || align=right | 5.9 km || 
|-id=734 bgcolor=#d6d6d6
| 8734 Warner || 1997 AA ||  || January 1, 1997 || Prescott || P. G. Comba || — || align=right | 4.9 km || 
|-id=735 bgcolor=#d6d6d6
| 8735 Yoshiosakai ||  ||  || January 2, 1997 || Oizumi || T. Kobayashi || — || align=right | 13 km || 
|-id=736 bgcolor=#fefefe
| 8736 Shigehisa ||  ||  || January 9, 1997 || Oizumi || T. Kobayashi || — || align=right | 3.8 km || 
|-id=737 bgcolor=#d6d6d6
| 8737 Takehiro ||  ||  || January 11, 1997 || Oizumi || T. Kobayashi || — || align=right | 18 km || 
|-id=738 bgcolor=#fefefe
| 8738 Saji ||  ||  || January 5, 1997 || Saji || Saji Obs. || — || align=right | 2.6 km || 
|-id=739 bgcolor=#d6d6d6
| 8739 Morihisa ||  ||  || January 30, 1997 || Oizumi || T. Kobayashi || — || align=right | 19 km || 
|-id=740 bgcolor=#d6d6d6
| 8740 Václav ||  ||  || January 12, 1998 || Kleť || M. Tichý, Z. Moravec || KOR || align=right | 5.9 km || 
|-id=741 bgcolor=#d6d6d6
| 8741 Suzukisuzuko ||  ||  || January 25, 1998 || Oizumi || T. Kobayashi || EOS || align=right | 6.7 km || 
|-id=742 bgcolor=#fefefe
| 8742 Bonazzoli ||  ||  || February 14, 1998 || Colleverde || V. S. Casulli || — || align=right | 4.3 km || 
|-id=743 bgcolor=#d6d6d6
| 8743 Kèneke ||  ||  || March 1, 1998 || La Silla || E. W. Elst || 3:2 || align=right | 27 km || 
|-id=744 bgcolor=#d6d6d6
| 8744 Cilla ||  ||  || March 20, 1998 || Socorro || LINEAR || THM || align=right | 12 km || 
|-id=745 bgcolor=#E9E9E9
| 8745 Delaney ||  ||  || March 20, 1998 || Socorro || LINEAR || — || align=right | 6.0 km || 
|-id=746 bgcolor=#d6d6d6
| 8746 ||  || — || March 20, 1998 || Socorro || LINEAR || HYG || align=right | 14 km || 
|-id=747 bgcolor=#d6d6d6
| 8747 Asahi ||  ||  || March 24, 1998 || Nanyo || T. Okuni || — || align=right | 12 km || 
|-id=748 bgcolor=#fefefe
| 8748 ||  || — || March 31, 1998 || Socorro || LINEAR || V || align=right | 4.1 km || 
|-id=749 bgcolor=#fefefe
| 8749 Beatles ||  ||  || April 3, 1998 || Reedy Creek || J. Broughton || — || align=right | 3.6 km || 
|-id=750 bgcolor=#fefefe
| 8750 Nettarufina || 2197 P-L ||  || September 24, 1960 || Palomar || PLS || — || align=right | 8.0 km || 
|-id=751 bgcolor=#d6d6d6
| 8751 Nigricollis || 2594 P-L ||  || September 24, 1960 || Palomar || PLS || KOR || align=right | 5.1 km || 
|-id=752 bgcolor=#fefefe
| 8752 Flammeus || 2604 P-L ||  || September 24, 1960 || Palomar || PLS || — || align=right | 3.4 km || 
|-id=753 bgcolor=#fefefe
| 8753 Nycticorax || 2636 P-L ||  || September 24, 1960 || Palomar || PLS || NYS || align=right | 2.5 km || 
|-id=754 bgcolor=#d6d6d6
| 8754 Leucorodia || 4521 P-L ||  || September 24, 1960 || Palomar || PLS || KOR || align=right | 7.8 km || 
|-id=755 bgcolor=#d6d6d6
| 8755 Querquedula || 4586 P-L ||  || September 24, 1960 || Palomar || PLS || — || align=right | 12 km || 
|-id=756 bgcolor=#d6d6d6
| 8756 Mollissima || 6588 P-L ||  || September 24, 1960 || Palomar || PLS || — || align=right | 11 km || 
|-id=757 bgcolor=#fefefe
| 8757 Cyaneus || 6600 P-L ||  || September 24, 1960 || Palomar || PLS || — || align=right | 2.5 km || 
|-id=758 bgcolor=#d6d6d6
| 8758 Perdix || 6683 P-L ||  || September 24, 1960 || Palomar || PLS || HYG || align=right | 8.0 km || 
|-id=759 bgcolor=#E9E9E9
| 8759 Porzana || 7603 P-L ||  || October 17, 1960 || Palomar || PLS || EUN || align=right | 5.1 km || 
|-id=760 bgcolor=#d6d6d6
| 8760 Crex || 1081 T-1 ||  || March 25, 1971 || Palomar || PLS || — || align=right | 6.6 km || 
|-id=761 bgcolor=#fefefe
| 8761 Crane || 1163 T-1 ||  || March 25, 1971 || Palomar || PLS || — || align=right | 5.0 km || 
|-id=762 bgcolor=#E9E9E9
| 8762 Hiaticula || 3196 T-1 ||  || March 26, 1971 || Palomar || PLS || — || align=right | 14 km || 
|-id=763 bgcolor=#E9E9E9
| 8763 Pugnax || 3271 T-1 ||  || March 26, 1971 || Palomar || PLS || HEN || align=right | 5.1 km || 
|-id=764 bgcolor=#fefefe
| 8764 Gallinago || 1109 T-2 ||  || September 29, 1973 || Palomar || PLS || NYS || align=right | 2.1 km || 
|-id=765 bgcolor=#E9E9E9
| 8765 Limosa || 1274 T-2 ||  || September 29, 1973 || Palomar || PLS || — || align=right | 8.1 km || 
|-id=766 bgcolor=#d6d6d6
| 8766 Niger || 1304 T-2 ||  || September 29, 1973 || Palomar || PLS || — || align=right | 11 km || 
|-id=767 bgcolor=#d6d6d6
| 8767 Commontern || 1335 T-2 ||  || September 29, 1973 || Palomar || PLS || THM || align=right | 7.7 km || 
|-id=768 bgcolor=#fefefe
| 8768 Barnowl || 2080 T-2 ||  || September 29, 1973 || Palomar || PLS || — || align=right | 4.9 km || 
|-id=769 bgcolor=#E9E9E9
| 8769 Arctictern || 2181 T-2 ||  || September 29, 1973 || Palomar || PLS || — || align=right | 6.8 km || 
|-id=770 bgcolor=#d6d6d6
| 8770 Totanus || 3076 T-2 ||  || September 30, 1973 || Palomar || PLS || THM || align=right | 15 km || 
|-id=771 bgcolor=#fefefe
| 8771 Biarmicus || 3187 T-2 ||  || September 30, 1973 || Palomar || PLS || V || align=right | 3.3 km || 
|-id=772 bgcolor=#fefefe
| 8772 Minutus || 4254 T-2 ||  || September 29, 1973 || Palomar || PLS || NYS || align=right | 3.5 km || 
|-id=773 bgcolor=#d6d6d6
| 8773 Torquilla || 5006 T-2 ||  || September 25, 1973 || Palomar || PLS || LIX || align=right | 15 km || 
|-id=774 bgcolor=#d6d6d6
| 8774 Viridis || 5162 T-2 ||  || September 25, 1973 || Palomar || PLS || EOS || align=right | 7.7 km || 
|-id=775 bgcolor=#fefefe
| 8775 Cristata || 5490 T-2 ||  || September 30, 1973 || Palomar || PLS || — || align=right | 2.3 km || 
|-id=776 bgcolor=#E9E9E9
| 8776 Campestris || 2287 T-3 ||  || October 16, 1977 || Palomar || PLS || — || align=right | 11 km || 
|-id=777 bgcolor=#E9E9E9
| 8777 Torquata || 5016 T-3 ||  || October 16, 1977 || Palomar || PLS || — || align=right | 11 km || 
|-id=778 bgcolor=#fefefe
| 8778 ||  || — || October 10, 1931 || Flagstaff || C. W. Tombaugh || — || align=right | 9.8 km || 
|-id=779 bgcolor=#d6d6d6
| 8779 ||  || — || October 26, 1971 || Hamburg-Bergedorf || L. Kohoutek || THM || align=right | 10 km || 
|-id=780 bgcolor=#fefefe
| 8780 Forte || 1975 LT ||  || June 13, 1975 || El Leoncito || M. R. Cesco || — || align=right | 3.0 km || 
|-id=781 bgcolor=#fefefe
| 8781 Yurka ||  ||  || April 1, 1976 || Nauchnij || N. S. Chernykh || NYS || align=right | 3.1 km || 
|-id=782 bgcolor=#fefefe
| 8782 Bakhrakh ||  ||  || October 26, 1976 || Nauchnij || T. M. Smirnova || NYS || align=right | 9.2 km || 
|-id=783 bgcolor=#fefefe
| 8783 Gopasyuk ||  ||  || March 13, 1977 || Nauchnij || N. S. Chernykh || — || align=right | 4.0 km || 
|-id=784 bgcolor=#fefefe
| 8784 ||  || — || September 9, 1977 || Palomar || C. M. Olmstead || — || align=right | 2.3 km || 
|-id=785 bgcolor=#fefefe
| 8785 Boltwood ||  ||  || September 5, 1978 || Nauchnij || N. S. Chernykh || NYS || align=right | 3.0 km || 
|-id=786 bgcolor=#d6d6d6
| 8786 Belskaya ||  ||  || September 2, 1978 || La Silla || C.-I. Lagerkvist || THM || align=right | 10 km || 
|-id=787 bgcolor=#d6d6d6
| 8787 Ignatenko ||  ||  || October 4, 1978 || Nauchnij || T. M. Smirnova || — || align=right | 17 km || 
|-id=788 bgcolor=#fefefe
| 8788 Labeyrie ||  ||  || November 1, 1978 || Caussols || K. Tomita || — || align=right | 3.3 km || 
|-id=789 bgcolor=#d6d6d6
| 8789 Effertz ||  ||  || November 7, 1978 || Palomar || E. F. Helin, S. J. Bus || — || align=right | 8.5 km || 
|-id=790 bgcolor=#E9E9E9
| 8790 Michaelamato ||  ||  || November 7, 1978 || Palomar || E. F. Helin, S. J. Bus || — || align=right | 6.0 km || 
|-id=791 bgcolor=#E9E9E9
| 8791 Donyabradshaw ||  ||  || November 7, 1978 || Palomar || E. F. Helin, S. J. Bus || — || align=right | 5.1 km || 
|-id=792 bgcolor=#E9E9E9
| 8792 Christyljohnson ||  ||  || November 7, 1978 || Palomar || E. F. Helin, S. J. Bus || — || align=right | 5.5 km || 
|-id=793 bgcolor=#E9E9E9
| 8793 Thomasmüller || 1979 QX ||  || August 22, 1979 || La Silla || C.-I. Lagerkvist || — || align=right | 5.1 km || 
|-id=794 bgcolor=#fefefe
| 8794 Joepatterson ||  ||  || March 6, 1981 || Siding Spring || S. J. Bus || — || align=right | 3.0 km || 
|-id=795 bgcolor=#d6d6d6
| 8795 Dudorov ||  ||  || March 1, 1981 || Siding Spring || S. J. Bus || — || align=right | 11 km || 
|-id=796 bgcolor=#fefefe
| 8796 Sonnett ||  ||  || March 7, 1981 || Siding Spring || S. J. Bus || — || align=right | 2.4 km || 
|-id=797 bgcolor=#d6d6d6
| 8797 Duffard ||  ||  || March 2, 1981 || Siding Spring || S. J. Bus || — || align=right | 8.2 km || 
|-id=798 bgcolor=#d6d6d6
| 8798 Tarantino ||  ||  || March 7, 1981 || Siding Spring || S. J. Bus || HYG || align=right | 6.8 km || 
|-id=799 bgcolor=#E9E9E9
| 8799 Barnouin ||  ||  || March 2, 1981 || Siding Spring || S. J. Bus || — || align=right | 3.2 km || 
|-id=800 bgcolor=#d6d6d6
| 8800 Brophy ||  ||  || March 2, 1981 || Siding Spring || S. J. Bus || HYG || align=right | 6.6 km || 
|}

8801–8900 

|-bgcolor=#d6d6d6
| 8801 Nugent ||  ||  || March 1, 1981 || Siding Spring || S. J. Bus || — || align=right | 7.4 km || 
|-id=802 bgcolor=#d6d6d6
| 8802 Negley ||  ||  || March 2, 1981 || Siding Spring || S. J. Bus || — || align=right | 7.6 km || 
|-id=803 bgcolor=#d6d6d6
| 8803 Kolyer ||  ||  || March 2, 1981 || Siding Spring || S. J. Bus || — || align=right | 11 km || 
|-id=804 bgcolor=#d6d6d6
| 8804 Eliason ||  ||  || May 5, 1981 || Palomar || C. S. Shoemaker, E. M. Shoemaker || — || align=right | 11 km || 
|-id=805 bgcolor=#fefefe
| 8805 Petrpetrov ||  ||  || October 22, 1981 || Nauchnij || N. S. Chernykh || — || align=right | 3.9 km || 
|-id=806 bgcolor=#E9E9E9
| 8806 Fetisov ||  ||  || October 22, 1981 || Nauchnij || N. S. Chernykh || — || align=right | 12 km || 
|-id=807 bgcolor=#fefefe
| 8807 Schenk ||  ||  || October 24, 1981 || Palomar || S. J. Bus || slow || align=right | 4.7 km || 
|-id=808 bgcolor=#E9E9E9
| 8808 Luhmann ||  ||  || October 24, 1981 || Palomar || S. J. Bus || HOF || align=right | 9.4 km || 
|-id=809 bgcolor=#E9E9E9
| 8809 Roversimonaco ||  ||  || November 24, 1981 || Anderson Mesa || E. Bowell || — || align=right | 4.9 km || 
|-id=810 bgcolor=#d6d6d6
| 8810 Johnmcfarland ||  ||  || May 15, 1982 || Palomar || E. F. Helin, E. M. Shoemaker || — || align=right | 11 km || 
|-id=811 bgcolor=#E9E9E9
| 8811 Waltherschmadel ||  ||  || October 20, 1982 || Nauchnij || L. G. Karachkina || NEM || align=right | 8.8 km || 
|-id=812 bgcolor=#E9E9E9
| 8812 Kravtsov ||  ||  || October 20, 1982 || Nauchnij || L. G. Karachkina || — || align=right | 11 km || 
|-id=813 bgcolor=#d6d6d6
| 8813 Leviathan ||  ||  || November 29, 1983 || Anderson Mesa || E. Bowell || — || align=right | 16 km || 
|-id=814 bgcolor=#d6d6d6
| 8814 Rosseven || 1983 XG ||  || December 1, 1983 || Anderson Mesa || E. Bowell || HYG || align=right | 17 km || 
|-id=815 bgcolor=#fefefe
| 8815 Deanregas || 1984 DR ||  || February 23, 1984 || La Silla || H. Debehogne || FLO || align=right | 4.5 km || 
|-id=816 bgcolor=#fefefe
| 8816 Gamow ||  ||  || December 17, 1984 || Nauchnij || L. G. Karachkina || NYS || align=right | 3.8 km || 
|-id=817 bgcolor=#fefefe
| 8817 Roytraver ||  ||  || May 13, 1985 || Palomar || C. S. Shoemaker, E. M. Shoemaker || FLO || align=right | 4.5 km || 
|-id=818 bgcolor=#E9E9E9
| 8818 Hermannbondi ||  ||  || September 5, 1985 || La Silla || H. Debehogne || AST || align=right | 9.4 km || 
|-id=819 bgcolor=#E9E9E9
| 8819 Chrisbondi ||  ||  || September 14, 1985 || La Silla || H. Debehogne || GEF || align=right | 5.3 km || 
|-id=820 bgcolor=#fefefe
| 8820 Anjandersen || 1985 VG ||  || November 14, 1985 || Brorfelde || P. Jensen || — || align=right | 4.9 km || 
|-id=821 bgcolor=#d6d6d6
| 8821 ||  || — || February 23, 1987 || La Silla || H. Debehogne || — || align=right | 9.5 km || 
|-id=822 bgcolor=#E9E9E9
| 8822 Shuryanka ||  ||  || September 1, 1987 || Nauchnij || L. G. Karachkina || — || align=right | 3.4 km || 
|-id=823 bgcolor=#E9E9E9
| 8823 ||  || — || November 24, 1987 || Anderson Mesa || S. McDonald || MIT || align=right | 11 km || 
|-id=824 bgcolor=#E9E9E9
| 8824 Genta || 1988 BH ||  || January 18, 1988 || Kushiro || M. Matsuyama, K. Watanabe || DOR || align=right | 11 km || 
|-id=825 bgcolor=#fefefe
| 8825 || 1988 MF || — || June 16, 1988 || Palomar || E. F. Helin || H || align=right | 2.2 km || 
|-id=826 bgcolor=#d6d6d6
| 8826 Corneville ||  ||  || August 13, 1988 || Haute-Provence || E. W. Elst || THM || align=right | 12 km || 
|-id=827 bgcolor=#fefefe
| 8827 Kollwitz ||  ||  || August 13, 1988 || Tautenburg Observatory || F. Börngen || — || align=right | 3.5 km || 
|-id=828 bgcolor=#fefefe
| 8828 ||  || — || September 10, 1988 || La Silla || H. Debehogne || — || align=right | 11 km || 
|-id=829 bgcolor=#d6d6d6
| 8829 Buczkowski ||  ||  || September 14, 1988 || Cerro Tololo || S. J. Bus || — || align=right | 14 km || 
|-id=830 bgcolor=#d6d6d6
| 8830 || 1988 VZ || — || November 7, 1988 || Yatsugatake || Y. Kushida, M. Inoue || — || align=right | 20 km || 
|-id=831 bgcolor=#E9E9E9
| 8831 Brändström ||  ||  || February 2, 1989 || Tautenburg Observatory || F. Börngen || — || align=right | 5.2 km || 
|-id=832 bgcolor=#E9E9E9
| 8832 Altenrath ||  ||  || March 2, 1989 || La Silla || E. W. Elst || KON || align=right | 11 km || 
|-id=833 bgcolor=#d6d6d6
| 8833 Acer || 1989 RW ||  || September 3, 1989 || Haute-Provence || E. W. Elst || — || align=right | 18 km || 
|-id=834 bgcolor=#d6d6d6
| 8834 Anacardium ||  ||  || September 26, 1989 || La Silla || E. W. Elst || HYG || align=right | 9.9 km || 
|-id=835 bgcolor=#d6d6d6
| 8835 Annona ||  ||  || September 26, 1989 || La Silla || E. W. Elst || — || align=right | 13 km || 
|-id=836 bgcolor=#d6d6d6
| 8836 Aquifolium ||  ||  || September 26, 1989 || La Silla || E. W. Elst || EOS || align=right | 9.4 km || 
|-id=837 bgcolor=#fefefe
| 8837 London ||  ||  || October 7, 1989 || La Silla || E. W. Elst || FLO || align=right | 2.4 km || 
|-id=838 bgcolor=#d6d6d6
| 8838 ||  || — || October 29, 1989 || Okutama || T. Hioki, N. Kawasato || — || align=right | 14 km || 
|-id=839 bgcolor=#d6d6d6
| 8839 Novichkova ||  ||  || October 24, 1989 || Nauchnij || L. I. Chernykh || HYG || align=right | 12 km || 
|-id=840 bgcolor=#fefefe
| 8840 || 1989 WT || — || November 20, 1989 || Kushiro || S. Ueda, H. Kaneda || — || align=right | 4.8 km || 
|-id=841 bgcolor=#E9E9E9
| 8841 ||  || — || March 2, 1990 || La Silla || H. Debehogne || — || align=right | 5.6 km || 
|-id=842 bgcolor=#E9E9E9
| 8842 Bennetmcinnes || 1990 KF ||  || May 20, 1990 || Siding Spring || R. H. McNaught || — || align=right | 5.4 km || 
|-id=843 bgcolor=#E9E9E9
| 8843 || 1990 OH || — || July 22, 1990 || Palomar || E. F. Helin || — || align=right | 6.5 km || 
|-id=844 bgcolor=#E9E9E9
| 8844 ||  || — || August 24, 1990 || Palomar || H. E. Holt || PAD || align=right | 14 km || 
|-id=845 bgcolor=#d6d6d6
| 8845 || 1990 RD || — || September 14, 1990 || Palomar || H. E. Holt || — || align=right | 12 km || 
|-id=846 bgcolor=#d6d6d6
| 8846 ||  || — || September 13, 1990 || La Silla || H. Debehogne || — || align=right | 9.5 km || 
|-id=847 bgcolor=#d6d6d6
| 8847 Huch ||  ||  || October 12, 1990 || Tautenburg Observatory || F. Börngen, L. D. Schmadel || KOR || align=right | 6.6 km || 
|-id=848 bgcolor=#d6d6d6
| 8848 ||  || — || November 12, 1990 || Kushiro || S. Ueda, H. Kaneda || — || align=right | 19 km || 
|-id=849 bgcolor=#d6d6d6
| 8849 Brighton ||  ||  || November 15, 1990 || La Silla || E. W. Elst || — || align=right | 13 km || 
|-id=850 bgcolor=#d6d6d6
| 8850 Bignonia ||  ||  || November 15, 1990 || La Silla || E. W. Elst || EOS || align=right | 9.6 km || 
|-id=851 bgcolor=#d6d6d6
| 8851 || 1990 XB || — || December 8, 1990 || Kani || Y. Mizuno, T. Furuta || — || align=right | 10 km || 
|-id=852 bgcolor=#fefefe
| 8852 Buxus ||  ||  || April 8, 1991 || La Silla || E. W. Elst || NYS || align=right | 4.0 km || 
|-id=853 bgcolor=#fefefe
| 8853 Gerdlehmann ||  ||  || April 9, 1991 || Tautenburg Observatory || F. Börngen || FLO || align=right | 2.6 km || 
|-id=854 bgcolor=#fefefe
| 8854 || 1991 HC || — || April 16, 1991 || Uenohara || N. Kawasato || FLO || align=right | 3.8 km || 
|-id=855 bgcolor=#fefefe
| 8855 Miwa || 1991 JL ||  || May 3, 1991 || Kiyosato || S. Otomo, O. Muramatsu || — || align=right | 4.0 km || 
|-id=856 bgcolor=#fefefe
| 8856 Celastrus ||  ||  || June 6, 1991 || La Silla || E. W. Elst || — || align=right | 3.7 km || 
|-id=857 bgcolor=#fefefe
| 8857 Cercidiphyllum ||  ||  || August 6, 1991 || La Silla || E. W. Elst || NYS || align=right | 6.5 km || 
|-id=858 bgcolor=#fefefe
| 8858 Cornus ||  ||  || August 6, 1991 || La Silla || E. W. Elst || NYS || align=right | 3.8 km || 
|-id=859 bgcolor=#E9E9E9
| 8859 ||  || — || August 9, 1991 || Palomar || H. E. Holt || — || align=right | 6.0 km || 
|-id=860 bgcolor=#E9E9E9
| 8860 Rohloff ||  ||  || October 5, 1991 || Tautenburg Observatory || L. D. Schmadel, F. Börngen || — || align=right | 8.9 km || 
|-id=861 bgcolor=#E9E9E9
| 8861 Jenskandler ||  ||  || October 3, 1991 || Tautenburg Observatory || F. Börngen, L. D. Schmadel || MIT || align=right | 14 km || 
|-id=862 bgcolor=#E9E9E9
| 8862 Takayukiota || 1991 UZ ||  || October 18, 1991 || Kiyosato || S. Otomo || — || align=right | 8.0 km || 
|-id=863 bgcolor=#E9E9E9
| 8863 ||  || — || October 31, 1991 || Kushiro || S. Ueda, H. Kaneda || — || align=right | 5.5 km || 
|-id=864 bgcolor=#E9E9E9
| 8864 || 1991 VU || — || November 4, 1991 || Kani || Y. Mizuno, T. Furuta || — || align=right | 7.9 km || 
|-id=865 bgcolor=#d6d6d6
| 8865 Yakiimo || 1992 AF ||  || January 1, 1992 || Yakiimo || A. Natori, T. Urata || — || align=right | 7.6 km || 
|-id=866 bgcolor=#d6d6d6
| 8866 Tanegashima || 1992 BR ||  || January 26, 1992 || Kagoshima || M. Mukai, M. Takeishi || — || align=right | 22 km || 
|-id=867 bgcolor=#d6d6d6
| 8867 Tubbiolo ||  ||  || January 29, 1992 || Kitt Peak || Spacewatch || KOR || align=right | 6.1 km || 
|-id=868 bgcolor=#d6d6d6
| 8868 Hjorter ||  ||  || March 1, 1992 || La Silla || UESAC || — || align=right | 8.9 km || 
|-id=869 bgcolor=#d6d6d6
| 8869 Olausgutho ||  ||  || March 6, 1992 || La Silla || UESAC || — || align=right | 10 km || 
|-id=870 bgcolor=#d6d6d6
| 8870 von Zeipel ||  ||  || March 6, 1992 || La Silla || UESAC || — || align=right | 13 km || 
|-id=871 bgcolor=#d6d6d6
| 8871 Svanberg ||  ||  || March 1, 1992 || La Silla || UESAC || — || align=right | 8.6 km || 
|-id=872 bgcolor=#d6d6d6
| 8872 Ebenum ||  ||  || April 4, 1992 || La Silla || E. W. Elst || THM || align=right | 12 km || 
|-id=873 bgcolor=#fefefe
| 8873 ||  || — || October 21, 1992 || Kani || Y. Mizuno, T. Furuta || FLO || align=right | 4.3 km || 
|-id=874 bgcolor=#fefefe
| 8874 Showashinzan ||  ||  || October 26, 1992 || Kitami || K. Endate, K. Watanabe || FLO || align=right | 3.3 km || 
|-id=875 bgcolor=#fefefe
| 8875 Fernie ||  ||  || October 22, 1992 || Palomar || E. Bowell || — || align=right | 2.9 km || 
|-id=876 bgcolor=#fefefe
| 8876 ||  || — || November 23, 1992 || Yatsugatake || Y. Kushida, O. Muramatsu || NYS || align=right | 5.2 km || 
|-id=877 bgcolor=#E9E9E9
| 8877 Rentaro ||  ||  || January 19, 1993 || Geisei || T. Seki || — || align=right | 7.8 km || 
|-id=878 bgcolor=#E9E9E9
| 8878 ||  || — || March 17, 1993 || La Silla || UESAC || — || align=right | 4.6 km || 
|-id=879 bgcolor=#E9E9E9
| 8879 ||  || — || March 19, 1993 || La Silla || UESAC || HEN || align=right | 5.1 km || 
|-id=880 bgcolor=#E9E9E9
| 8880 ||  || — || March 19, 1993 || La Silla || UESAC || AGN || align=right | 5.2 km || 
|-id=881 bgcolor=#E9E9E9
| 8881 Prialnik ||  ||  || March 19, 1993 || La Silla || UESAC || — || align=right | 10 km || 
|-id=882 bgcolor=#fefefe
| 8882 Sakaetamura ||  ||  || January 10, 1994 || Kitami || K. Endate, K. Watanabe || — || align=right | 6.5 km || 
|-id=883 bgcolor=#fefefe
| 8883 Miyazakihayao ||  ||  || January 16, 1994 || Oizumi || T. Kobayashi || — || align=right | 3.7 km || 
|-id=884 bgcolor=#fefefe
| 8884 ||  || — || February 12, 1994 || Lake Tekapo || A. C. Gilmore, P. M. Kilmartin || — || align=right | 5.2 km || 
|-id=885 bgcolor=#fefefe
| 8885 Sette ||  ||  || March 13, 1994 || Cima Ekar || M. Tombelli, V. Goretti || slow? || align=right | 6.7 km || 
|-id=886 bgcolor=#fefefe
| 8886 Elaeagnus ||  ||  || March 9, 1994 || Caussols || E. W. Elst || FLO || align=right | 3.4 km || 
|-id=887 bgcolor=#E9E9E9
| 8887 Scheeres ||  ||  || June 9, 1994 || Palomar || E. F. Helin || MAR || align=right | 7.8 km || 
|-id=888 bgcolor=#E9E9E9
| 8888 Tartaglia ||  ||  || July 8, 1994 || Caussols || E. W. Elst || — || align=right | 14 km || 
|-id=889 bgcolor=#d6d6d6
| 8889 Mockturtle || 1994 OC ||  || July 31, 1994 || Nachi-Katsuura || Y. Shimizu, T. Urata || — || align=right | 23 km || 
|-id=890 bgcolor=#d6d6d6
| 8890 Montaigne ||  ||  || August 10, 1994 || La Silla || E. W. Elst || THM || align=right | 9.9 km || 
|-id=891 bgcolor=#d6d6d6
| 8891 Irokawa ||  ||  || September 1, 1994 || Kitami || K. Endate, K. Watanabe || — || align=right | 16 km || 
|-id=892 bgcolor=#d6d6d6
| 8892 Kakogawa ||  ||  || September 11, 1994 || Minami-Oda || M. Sugano, T. Nomura || THM || align=right | 13 km || 
|-id=893 bgcolor=#fefefe
| 8893 || 1995 KZ || — || May 23, 1995 || Catalina Station || T. B. Spahr || PHO || align=right | 4.1 km || 
|-id=894 bgcolor=#fefefe
| 8894 || 1995 PV || — || August 2, 1995 || Nachi-Katsuura || Y. Shimizu, T. Urata || — || align=right | 4.6 km || 
|-id=895 bgcolor=#fefefe
| 8895 Nha || 1995 QN ||  || August 21, 1995 || JCPM Sapporo || K. Watanabe || FLO || align=right | 4.4 km || 
|-id=896 bgcolor=#fefefe
| 8896 ||  || — || August 24, 1995 || Nachi-Katsuura || Y. Shimizu, T. Urata || V || align=right | 4.6 km || 
|-id=897 bgcolor=#fefefe
| 8897 Defelice || 1995 SX ||  || September 22, 1995 || Stroncone || Santa Lucia Obs. || V || align=right | 3.1 km || 
|-id=898 bgcolor=#fefefe
| 8898 Linnaea ||  ||  || September 29, 1995 || Golden || G. Emerson || NYS || align=right | 3.1 km || 
|-id=899 bgcolor=#E9E9E9
| 8899 Hughmiller ||  ||  || September 22, 1995 || Siding Spring || R. H. McNaught || — || align=right | 5.0 km || 
|-id=900 bgcolor=#E9E9E9
| 8900 AAVSO ||  ||  || October 24, 1995 || Sudbury || D. di Cicco || — || align=right | 5.8 km || 
|}

8901–9000 

|-bgcolor=#d6d6d6
| 8901 ||  || — || October 20, 1995 || Oizumi || T. Kobayashi || EOS || align=right | 15 km || 
|-id=902 bgcolor=#d6d6d6
| 8902 ||  || — || October 20, 1995 || Oizumi || T. Kobayashi || — || align=right | 10 km || 
|-id=903 bgcolor=#E9E9E9
| 8903 Paulcruikshank ||  ||  || October 26, 1995 || Nachi-Katsuura || Y. Shimizu, T. Urata || — || align=right | 5.6 km || 
|-id=904 bgcolor=#E9E9E9
| 8904 Yoshihara || 1995 VY ||  || November 15, 1995 || Oizumi || T. Kobayashi || — || align=right | 4.7 km || 
|-id=905 bgcolor=#E9E9E9
| 8905 Bankakuko || 1995 WJ ||  || November 16, 1995 || Oizumi || T. Kobayashi || — || align=right | 4.1 km || 
|-id=906 bgcolor=#d6d6d6
| 8906 Yano ||  ||  || November 18, 1995 || Oizumi || T. Kobayashi || THM || align=right | 14 km || 
|-id=907 bgcolor=#d6d6d6
| 8907 Takaji ||  ||  || November 24, 1995 || Oizumi || T. Kobayashi || — || align=right | 6.6 km || 
|-id=908 bgcolor=#d6d6d6
| 8908 ||  || — || November 18, 1995 || Kushiro || S. Ueda, H. Kaneda || EOS || align=right | 12 km || 
|-id=909 bgcolor=#E9E9E9
| 8909 Ohnishitaka ||  ||  || November 27, 1995 || Oizumi || T. Kobayashi || — || align=right | 6.2 km || 
|-id=910 bgcolor=#d6d6d6
| 8910 ||  || — || November 25, 1995 || Kushiro || S. Ueda, H. Kaneda || — || align=right | 13 km || 
|-id=911 bgcolor=#d6d6d6
| 8911 Kawaguchijun || 1995 YA ||  || December 17, 1995 || Oizumi || T. Kobayashi || — || align=right | 15 km || 
|-id=912 bgcolor=#d6d6d6
| 8912 Ohshimatake ||  ||  || December 21, 1995 || Oizumi || T. Kobayashi || THM || align=right | 11 km || 
|-id=913 bgcolor=#d6d6d6
| 8913 ||  || — || December 22, 1995 || Haleakalā || NEAT || SHU3:2 || align=right | 20 km || 
|-id=914 bgcolor=#d6d6d6
| 8914 Nickjames ||  ||  || December 25, 1995 || Stakenbridge || B. G. W. Manning || EOS || align=right | 11 km || 
|-id=915 bgcolor=#d6d6d6
| 8915 Sawaishujiro ||  ||  || December 27, 1995 || Oizumi || T. Kobayashi || 3:2 || align=right | 30 km || 
|-id=916 bgcolor=#E9E9E9
| 8916 || 1996 CC || — || February 1, 1996 || Xinglong || SCAP || — || align=right | 8.0 km || 
|-id=917 bgcolor=#d6d6d6
| 8917 Tianjindaxue ||  ||  || March 9, 1996 || Xinglong || SCAP || 7:4 || align=right | 37 km || 
|-id=918 bgcolor=#fefefe
| 8918 ||  || — || July 20, 1996 || Xinglong || SCAP || FLO || align=right | 4.7 km || 
|-id=919 bgcolor=#E9E9E9
| 8919 Ouyangziyuan ||  ||  || October 9, 1996 || Xinglong || SCAP || — || align=right | 6.4 km || 
|-id=920 bgcolor=#fefefe
| 8920 ||  || — || November 7, 1996 || Kushiro || S. Ueda, H. Kaneda || NYS || align=right | 3.2 km || 
|-id=921 bgcolor=#fefefe
| 8921 ||  || — || November 7, 1996 || Kushiro || S. Ueda, H. Kaneda || — || align=right | 4.0 km || 
|-id=922 bgcolor=#fefefe
| 8922 Kumanodake ||  ||  || November 10, 1996 || Nanyo || T. Okuni || FLO || align=right | 4.0 km || 
|-id=923 bgcolor=#fefefe
| 8923 Yamakawa ||  ||  || November 30, 1996 || Oizumi || T. Kobayashi || NYS || align=right | 3.1 km || 
|-id=924 bgcolor=#fefefe
| 8924 Iruma ||  ||  || December 14, 1996 || Chichibu || N. Satō || — || align=right | 3.6 km || 
|-id=925 bgcolor=#fefefe
| 8925 Boattini ||  ||  || December 4, 1996 || Cima Ekar || M. Tombelli, U. Munari || — || align=right | 4.4 km || 
|-id=926 bgcolor=#d6d6d6
| 8926 Abemasanao || 1996 YK ||  || December 20, 1996 || Oizumi || T. Kobayashi || THM || align=right | 9.9 km || 
|-id=927 bgcolor=#fefefe
| 8927 Ryojiro || 1996 YT ||  || December 20, 1996 || Oizumi || T. Kobayashi || NYS || align=right | 9.1 km || 
|-id=928 bgcolor=#fefefe
| 8928 ||  || — || December 23, 1996 || Xinglong || SCAP || — || align=right | 4.7 km || 
|-id=929 bgcolor=#fefefe
| 8929 Haginoshinji ||  ||  || December 29, 1996 || Oizumi || T. Kobayashi || FLO || align=right | 3.4 km || 
|-id=930 bgcolor=#fefefe
| 8930 Kubota ||  ||  || January 6, 1997 || Oizumi || T. Kobayashi || FLO || align=right | 4.0 km || 
|-id=931 bgcolor=#fefefe
| 8931 Hirokimatsuo ||  ||  || January 6, 1997 || Oizumi || T. Kobayashi || NYS || align=right | 4.5 km || 
|-id=932 bgcolor=#d6d6d6
| 8932 Nagatomo ||  ||  || January 6, 1997 || Oizumi || T. Kobayashi || KOR || align=right | 7.4 km || 
|-id=933 bgcolor=#d6d6d6
| 8933 Kurobe ||  ||  || January 6, 1997 || Chichibu || N. Satō || KOR || align=right | 7.1 km || 
|-id=934 bgcolor=#d6d6d6
| 8934 Nishimurajun ||  ||  || January 10, 1997 || Oizumi || T. Kobayashi || — || align=right | 16 km || 
|-id=935 bgcolor=#fefefe
| 8935 Beccaria ||  ||  || January 11, 1997 || Sormano || P. Sicoli, M. Cavagna || FLO || align=right | 3.3 km || 
|-id=936 bgcolor=#fefefe
| 8936 Gianni ||  ||  || January 14, 1997 || Farra d'Isonzo || Farra d'Isonzo || — || align=right | 3.9 km || 
|-id=937 bgcolor=#fefefe
| 8937 Gassan ||  ||  || January 13, 1997 || Nanyo || T. Okuni || — || align=right | 5.7 km || 
|-id=938 bgcolor=#fefefe
| 8938 ||  || — || January 9, 1997 || Kushiro || S. Ueda, H. Kaneda || — || align=right | 3.3 km || 
|-id=939 bgcolor=#d6d6d6
| 8939 Onodajunjiro ||  ||  || January 29, 1997 || Oizumi || T. Kobayashi || KOR || align=right | 6.3 km || 
|-id=940 bgcolor=#d6d6d6
| 8940 Yakushimaru ||  ||  || January 29, 1997 || Oizumi || T. Kobayashi || — || align=right | 7.1 km || 
|-id=941 bgcolor=#d6d6d6
| 8941 Junsaito ||  ||  || January 30, 1997 || Oizumi || T. Kobayashi || — || align=right | 18 km || 
|-id=942 bgcolor=#E9E9E9
| 8942 Takagi ||  ||  || January 30, 1997 || Oizumi || T. Kobayashi || slow || align=right | 4.3 km || 
|-id=943 bgcolor=#E9E9E9
| 8943 Stefanozavka ||  ||  || January 30, 1997 || Stroncone || A. Vagnozzi || DOR || align=right | 8.8 km || 
|-id=944 bgcolor=#d6d6d6
| 8944 Ortigara ||  ||  || January 30, 1997 || Cima Ekar || U. Munari, M. Tombelli || THM || align=right | 7.6 km || 
|-id=945 bgcolor=#d6d6d6
| 8945 Cavaradossi || 1997 CM ||  || February 1, 1997 || Prescott || P. G. Comba || — || align=right | 8.7 km || 
|-id=946 bgcolor=#d6d6d6
| 8946 Yoshimitsu || 1997 CO ||  || February 1, 1997 || Oizumi || T. Kobayashi || KOR || align=right | 8.5 km || 
|-id=947 bgcolor=#E9E9E9
| 8947 Mizutani ||  ||  || February 14, 1997 || Oizumi || T. Kobayashi || — || align=right | 8.6 km || 
|-id=948 bgcolor=#fefefe
| 8948 ||  || — || February 6, 1997 || Xinglong || SCAP || NYS || align=right | 4.6 km || 
|-id=949 bgcolor=#E9E9E9
| 8949 ||  || — || February 13, 1997 || Xinglong || SCAP || — || align=right | 4.9 km || 
|-id=950 bgcolor=#d6d6d6
| 8950 ||  || — || March 15, 1997 || Xinglong || SCAP || — || align=right | 14 km || 
|-id=951 bgcolor=#d6d6d6
| 8951 || 1997 FO || — || March 19, 1997 || Xinglong || SCAP || EOS || align=right | 12 km || 
|-id=952 bgcolor=#E9E9E9
| 8952 ODAS ||  ||  || March 2, 1998 || Caussols || ODAS || — || align=right | 4.8 km || 
|-id=953 bgcolor=#d6d6d6
| 8953 ||  || — || March 20, 1998 || Socorro || LINEAR || KOR || align=right | 5.7 km || 
|-id=954 bgcolor=#fefefe
| 8954 Baral ||  ||  || March 20, 1998 || Socorro || LINEAR || FLO || align=right | 4.9 km || 
|-id=955 bgcolor=#E9E9E9
| 8955 ||  || — || March 24, 1998 || Socorro || LINEAR || — || align=right | 7.4 km || 
|-id=956 bgcolor=#fefefe
| 8956 ||  || — || March 31, 1998 || Socorro || LINEAR || — || align=right | 3.6 km || 
|-id=957 bgcolor=#fefefe
| 8957 Koujounotsuki ||  ||  || March 22, 1998 || Geisei || T. Seki || — || align=right | 4.1 km || 
|-id=958 bgcolor=#E9E9E9
| 8958 Stargazer ||  ||  || March 23, 1998 || Reedy Creek || J. Broughton || — || align=right | 6.0 km || 
|-id=959 bgcolor=#fefefe
| 8959 Oenanthe || 2550 P-L ||  || September 24, 1960 || Palomar || PLS || — || align=right | 3.2 km || 
|-id=960 bgcolor=#d6d6d6
| 8960 Luscinioides || 2575 P-L ||  || September 24, 1960 || Palomar || PLS || — || align=right | 11 km || 
|-id=961 bgcolor=#d6d6d6
| 8961 Schoenobaenus || 2702 P-L ||  || September 24, 1960 || Palomar || PLS || THM || align=right | 9.5 km || 
|-id=962 bgcolor=#d6d6d6
| 8962 Noctua || 2771 P-L ||  || September 24, 1960 || Palomar || PLS || — || align=right | 17 km || 
|-id=963 bgcolor=#d6d6d6
| 8963 Collurio || 4651 P-L ||  || September 24, 1960 || Palomar || PLS || THM || align=right | 11 km || 
|-id=964 bgcolor=#fefefe
| 8964 Corax || 7643 P-L ||  || October 17, 1960 || Palomar || PLS || FLO || align=right | 3.0 km || 
|-id=965 bgcolor=#d6d6d6
| 8965 Citrinella || 9511 P-L ||  || October 17, 1960 || Palomar || PLS || THM || align=right | 13 km || 
|-id=966 bgcolor=#d6d6d6
| 8966 Hortulana || 3287 T-1 ||  || March 26, 1971 || Palomar || PLS || THM || align=right | 8.9 km || 
|-id=967 bgcolor=#d6d6d6
| 8967 Calandra || 4878 T-1 ||  || May 13, 1971 || Palomar || PLS || — || align=right | 8.4 km || 
|-id=968 bgcolor=#d6d6d6
| 8968 Europaeus || 1212 T-2 ||  || September 29, 1973 || Palomar || PLS || EOS || align=right | 12 km || 
|-id=969 bgcolor=#fefefe
| 8969 Alexandrinus || 1218 T-2 ||  || September 29, 1973 || Palomar || PLS || — || align=right | 4.2 km || 
|-id=970 bgcolor=#d6d6d6
| 8970 Islandica || 1355 T-2 ||  || September 29, 1973 || Palomar || PLS || THM || align=right | 9.3 km || 
|-id=971 bgcolor=#d6d6d6
| 8971 Leucocephala || 2256 T-2 ||  || September 29, 1973 || Palomar || PLS || THM || align=right | 11 km || 
|-id=972 bgcolor=#fefefe
| 8972 Sylvatica || 2319 T-2 ||  || September 29, 1973 || Palomar || PLS || — || align=right | 2.8 km || 
|-id=973 bgcolor=#fefefe
| 8973 Pratincola || 3297 T-2 ||  || September 30, 1973 || Palomar || PLS || — || align=right | 4.7 km || 
|-id=974 bgcolor=#fefefe
| 8974 Gregaria || 3357 T-2 ||  || September 25, 1973 || Palomar || PLS || — || align=right | 2.6 km || 
|-id=975 bgcolor=#fefefe
| 8975 Atthis || 4076 T-2 ||  || September 29, 1973 || Palomar || PLS || NYS || align=right | 2.6 km || 
|-id=976 bgcolor=#d6d6d6
| 8976 Leucura || 4221 T-2 ||  || September 29, 1973 || Palomar || PLS || THM || align=right | 13 km || 
|-id=977 bgcolor=#fefefe
| 8977 Paludicola || 4272 T-2 ||  || September 29, 1973 || Palomar || PLS || — || align=right | 2.8 km || 
|-id=978 bgcolor=#d6d6d6
| 8978 Barbatus || 3109 T-3 ||  || October 16, 1977 || Palomar || PLS || THM || align=right | 9.1 km || 
|-id=979 bgcolor=#fefefe
| 8979 Clanga || 3476 T-3 ||  || October 16, 1977 || Palomar || PLS || — || align=right | 2.6 km || 
|-id=980 bgcolor=#E9E9E9
| 8980 Heliaca || 4190 T-3 ||  || October 16, 1977 || Palomar || PLS || DOR || align=right | 7.3 km || 
|-id=981 bgcolor=#d6d6d6
| 8981 || 1964 YJ || — || December 31, 1964 || Nanking || Purple Mountain Obs. || EOS || align=right | 14 km || 
|-id=982 bgcolor=#fefefe
| 8982 Oreshek ||  ||  || September 25, 1973 || Nauchnij || L. V. Zhuravleva || V || align=right | 3.8 km || 
|-id=983 bgcolor=#d6d6d6
| 8983 Rayakazakova ||  ||  || March 13, 1977 || Nauchnij || N. S. Chernykh || EOS || align=right | 12 km || 
|-id=984 bgcolor=#E9E9E9
| 8984 Derevyanko ||  ||  || August 22, 1977 || Nauchnij || N. S. Chernykh || — || align=right | 5.3 km || 
|-id=985 bgcolor=#fefefe
| 8985 Tula ||  ||  || August 9, 1978 || Nauchnij || N. S. Chernykh, L. I. Chernykh || — || align=right | 3.3 km || 
|-id=986 bgcolor=#d6d6d6
| 8986 Kineyayasuyo ||  ||  || November 1, 1978 || Caussols || K. Tomita || THM || align=right | 11 km || 
|-id=987 bgcolor=#E9E9E9
| 8987 Cavancuddy ||  ||  || November 7, 1978 || Palomar || E. F. Helin, S. J. Bus || — || align=right | 3.3 km || 
|-id=988 bgcolor=#d6d6d6
| 8988 ||  || — || June 25, 1979 || Siding Spring || E. F. Helin, S. J. Bus || 7:4 || align=right | 16 km || 
|-id=989 bgcolor=#fefefe
| 8989 || 1979 XJ || — || December 15, 1979 || La Silla || H. Debehogne, E. R. Netto || — || align=right | 3.2 km || 
|-id=990 bgcolor=#d6d6d6
| 8990 Compassion || 1980 DN ||  || February 19, 1980 || Kleť || Kleť Obs. || — || align=right | 17 km || 
|-id=991 bgcolor=#E9E9E9
| 8991 Solidarity ||  ||  || August 6, 1980 || La Silla || ESO || — || align=right | 8.4 km || 
|-id=992 bgcolor=#fefefe
| 8992 Magnanimity ||  ||  || October 14, 1980 || Nanking || Purple Mountain Obs. || — || align=right | 5.8 km || 
|-id=993 bgcolor=#fefefe
| 8993 Ingstad || 1980 UL ||  || October 30, 1980 || La Silla || R. M. West || — || align=right | 7.1 km || 
|-id=994 bgcolor=#E9E9E9
| 8994 Kashkashian || 1980 VG ||  || November 6, 1980 || Anderson Mesa || B. A. Skiff || — || align=right | 6.5 km || 
|-id=995 bgcolor=#E9E9E9
| 8995 Rachelstevenson ||  ||  || March 1, 1981 || Siding Spring || S. J. Bus || EUN || align=right | 7.8 km || 
|-id=996 bgcolor=#d6d6d6
| 8996 Waynedwards ||  ||  || March 1, 1981 || Siding Spring || S. J. Bus || — || align=right | 7.3 km || 
|-id=997 bgcolor=#E9E9E9
| 8997 Davidblewett ||  ||  || March 1, 1981 || Siding Spring || S. J. Bus || — || align=right | 6.0 km || 
|-id=998 bgcolor=#d6d6d6
| 8998 Matthewizawa ||  ||  || March 3, 1981 || Siding Spring || S. J. Bus || THM || align=right | 9.2 km || 
|-id=999 bgcolor=#fefefe
| 8999 Tashadunn ||  ||  || March 2, 1981 || Siding Spring || S. J. Bus || — || align=right | 2.3 km || 
|-id=000 bgcolor=#fefefe
| 9000 Hal || 1981 JO ||  || May 3, 1981 || Anderson Mesa || E. Bowell || slow || align=right | 3.6 km || 
|}

References

External links 
 Discovery Circumstances: Numbered Minor Planets (5001)–(10000) (IAU Minor Planet Center)

0008